= List of Korean clothing =

Hanbok refers to the traditional clothing of Korea. This is a list of Korean clothing including the national costume, hanbok, as well as headgear, footwear, and accessories.

== Hanbok ==
Baji	Baji (바지) are a form of baggy pants (see more pictures at commons:Category:Baji).
Chima	Chima (치마) is a type of skirt
Chima jeogori	Chima jeogori (치마저고리) is a type of skirt worn together with a jeogori, a short jacket.
Dangui	Dangui is a female upper garment worn for ceremonial occasions during the Joseon Dynasty. Dangui was also called dang-jeogori (당저고리), dang-jeoksam (당적삼), or dang-hansam (당한삼).
Dopo	Dopo is a variety of po (an overcoat) mostly worn by male Confucian scholars called seonbi since the mid-Joseon period.
Durumagi	Durumagi is a lined overcoat worn by men or women with no slit. It is most commonly held closed with a single goreum.
Garot	Garot is a type of working and everyday dress dyed with the juice of unripe persimmons. It has been worn by Jeju Island locals.
Gwanbok	Gwanbok is a Korean general term referring to all business attire of government officers issued by the government, with rank badges on them to distinguish hierarchies.
Gonryongpo	
Hakchangui	
Hwarot	Hwarot is a type of traditional Korean clothing worn during the Goryeo and Joseon Dynasty by royal women for ceremonial occasions or by commoners for weddings. It originated from the Kingdom of Khotan, Central Asia.
Jeogori	Jeogori is a basic upper garment which has been worn by both men and women. It covers the arms and upper part of the wearer's body.
Jeonbok	Jeonbok is a type of sleeveless long vest mostly worn by military personnel. It does not have overlapped column on the front side, and was worn over dongdari.
Jokki	Jokki is a type of vest.
Kkachi durumagi	Kkachi durumagi is a colorful children's overcoat worn on Korean New Year. It was worn over a jeogori or jokki while the wearer could put a jeonbok over it. Kkachi durumagi was also worn along with headgear such as bokgeon, hogeon or gulle.
Magoja	The magoja is a type of long jacket worn with hanbok, the traditional clothing of Korea, and is usually worn on top of the jeogori (short jacket).
Po	The po is a generic term referring to an outer robe or overcoat in hanbok.
Sagyusam	Sagyusam is a type of po (outer robe) worn by young boys until their coming-of-age ceremony called gwallye. The name was derived from the shape; the lower end of the garment is divided into four parts.
Saekdongot	Saekdongot is any hanbok patchworked with colorful stripes. It began to be made in the Goryeo period (918 – 1392). The name literally means 'many-colored clothing'. It was usually worn by children of the age of one to seven years old. The saekdong can be applied throughout jeogori (a short jacket with sash), majoja (buttoned jacket), durumagi (overcoat), among others.
Wonsam	Wonsam is a female ceremonial topcoat worn during the Joseon Dynasty. The queen, princess consort, and consort to the first son of the crown prince wore it as a soryebok, a robe for small ceremonies, while wives of high officers and sanggung (court matrons) wore it as daeryebok, a robe for major ceremonies. The color and decorations of the garment around the chest, shoulders and back represent the wearer's rank.

== Headgear ==
Ayam	An ayam is a traditional winter cap mostly worn by women during the Joseon period. It is also called aegeom, meaning 'covering a forehead'. The ayam consists of a crown and trailing big ribbons. The upper part of the crown is finely quilted, and its outer fabric consists of black or purple silk. While black or dark brown fur is used for the rest of the crown, the fabric for the inner is red cotton flannel. A tassel is attached to the upper center of both front and back. Some ayam worn by kisaeng (female entertainers) were luxuriously adorned with jewels. The ayam worn for spring and autumn has the same shape as the one for winter, but it is made of a lighter silk.
Banggeon	
Beonggeoji	A beonggeoji is a Korean hat worn by military officers in a low class or servants of yangban, aristocrats during the Joseon Dynasty.
Bokgeon	A bokgeon is a type of men's traditional headgear made from a black fabric.
Chaek	
Daesu	
Gache	The gache is a large wig worn by Korean women.
Gat	A gat (갓) is a type of Korean traditional hat worn by men along with hanbok during the Joseon period.
Gulle	A gulle is a type of sseugae (쓰개), Korean traditional headgear, worn by children aged one year to five years old during the late Joseon period.
Hogeon	A hogeon is a type of gwanmo (관모), Korean traditional headgear for young boys aged one year to five years old. It was worn along with durumagi or jeonbok.
Hwagwan	A hwagwan is a type of Korean coronet worn by women traditionally for ceremonial occasions such as weddings.
Ikseongwang	
Jangot	A jang-ot (장옷) is a form of outerwear worn by women of the Joseon Dynasty period as a veil to cover their faces.
Jeongjagwan	
Jeonmo	
Jobawi	A jobawi is a type of traditional Korean winter cap with ear flaps which was worn by women and was made of silk.
Jokduri	A jokduri is a type of Korean traditional coronet worn by women for special occasions such as weddings.
Joujeolpung	
Manggeon	
Nambawi	A nambawi is a type of traditional Korean winter hat worn by both men and women during the Joseon period for protection against the cold.
Pungcha	A pungcha is a type of traditional Korean winter hat worn by both men and women during the Joseon period for protection against the cold.
Tanggeon	Tanggeon is a type of Korean traditional headgear worn by men, which is put under a gat.
Tongcheongwan	
Satgat	The satgat (삿갓) is an Asian conical hat, commonly known as an Asian rice hat, coolie hat, oriental hat or farmer's hat and is a simple style of conical hat originating in East and Southeast Asia.
Sseugaechima	The sseugaechima is a form of headwear worn by Korean noblewomen.
Waryonggwan	
Yanggwan	The yanggwan was a kind of crown worn by officials when they wore a jobok (朝服) and jebok (祭服, ceremonial clothing) during the Joseon Dynasty.

== Footwear ==
Beoseon	The beoseon is a type of paired socks worn with the hanbok, Korean traditional clothing, and is made for protection, warmth, and style.
Gomusin	Gomusin are traditional Korean shoes made of rubber. Presently, they are mostly worn by the elderly and Buddhist monks and nuns.
Hwa	Hwa (화) is a generic term referring to all kinds of boots.
Hye	Hye (혜) come in several varieties: buntuhye (분투혜), taesahye (태사혜), danghye (당혜), and unhye (운혜).
Jipsin	Jipsin (집신) are traditional Korean sandals made of straw.
Mituri	Mituri (미투리) are shoes made generally of hemp fabric.
Mokhwa	Mokhwa (목화) are a variety of hwa, worn by officials along with gwanbok (official clothing) during the mid- and late Joseon Dynasty.
Namaksin	Namaksin (나막신) are a kind of traditional Korean clog made of wood for protection against mud and rain. Due to the nature of the wood, it has to be thick and large, so it is light and does not break, and is easy to manufacture. Ginkgo, paulownia, blood, and pine are used.

== Accessories ==
Baetssi	Baetssi is a hair ornament for young girls.
Balhyang	Balhyang is a pendant including incense. ^{image}
Binyeo	Binyeo (비녀) is a large decorative stick like a hairpin.
Buchae	Buchae is a Korean fan.
Cheopji	Cheopji (첩지) is a hair pin.
Chimnang	Chimnang (침낭) are pockets for needles.^{image}
Daenggi	
Donggot	Donggot is a pin for tying sangtu (men's topknot)^{image}
Dwikkoji	Dwikkoji (뒤꼬지)
Eunjangdo	Eunjangdo is a women's ornamental silver dagger.
Gakdae	Gakdae (각대 角帶) is a belt worn by officials.^{image}
Gwadae	Gwadae is a type of ornament.
Gwanja	Gwanja (Korean: 관자; Hanja: 貫子) are small holes attached to a manggeon (hairband)^{image}
Gwansik	Gwansik is an ornament attached to crowns or hats.
Hyangdae	Hyangdae (향대), also called a nunmul goreum (눈물고름) is a ribbon worn from the chima of a woman's dress, sometimes embroidered for the upper class and sometimes with a tassel used for a handkerchief, especially in mourning.
Jumeoni	
Norigae	Norigae are pendants.
Tteoljam	

== See also ==
- White clothing in Korea
- Fashion in South Korea
