= Kkachi durumagi =

Traditional Korean overcoat

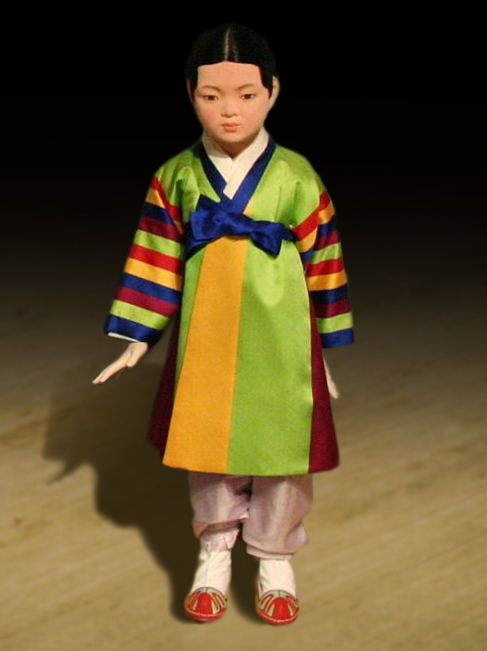
- A Kkachi durumagi for boys.

Korean name
- Hangul: 까치 두루마기; 오방장 두루마기
- Hanja: (none); 五方丈 두루마기
- RR: kkachi durumagi; obangjang durumagi
- MR: kkach'i turumagi; obangjang turumagi

Kkachi durumagi is a colorful overcoat traditionally worn by children as part of hanbok on Seollal, the Korean Lunar New Year. It was worn mostly by young boys and literally means "a magpie's overcoat". The garment is also called obangjang durumagi which denotes "an overcoat of five directions". It was worn over jeogori (a jacket) and jokki (a vest) while the wearer could put jeonbok (a long vest) over it. Kkachi durumagi was also worn along with headgear such as bokgeon (a peaked cloth hat), hogeon (peaked cloth hat with a tiger pattern) for young boys or gulle (decorative headgear) for young girls.

== Etymology and color ==
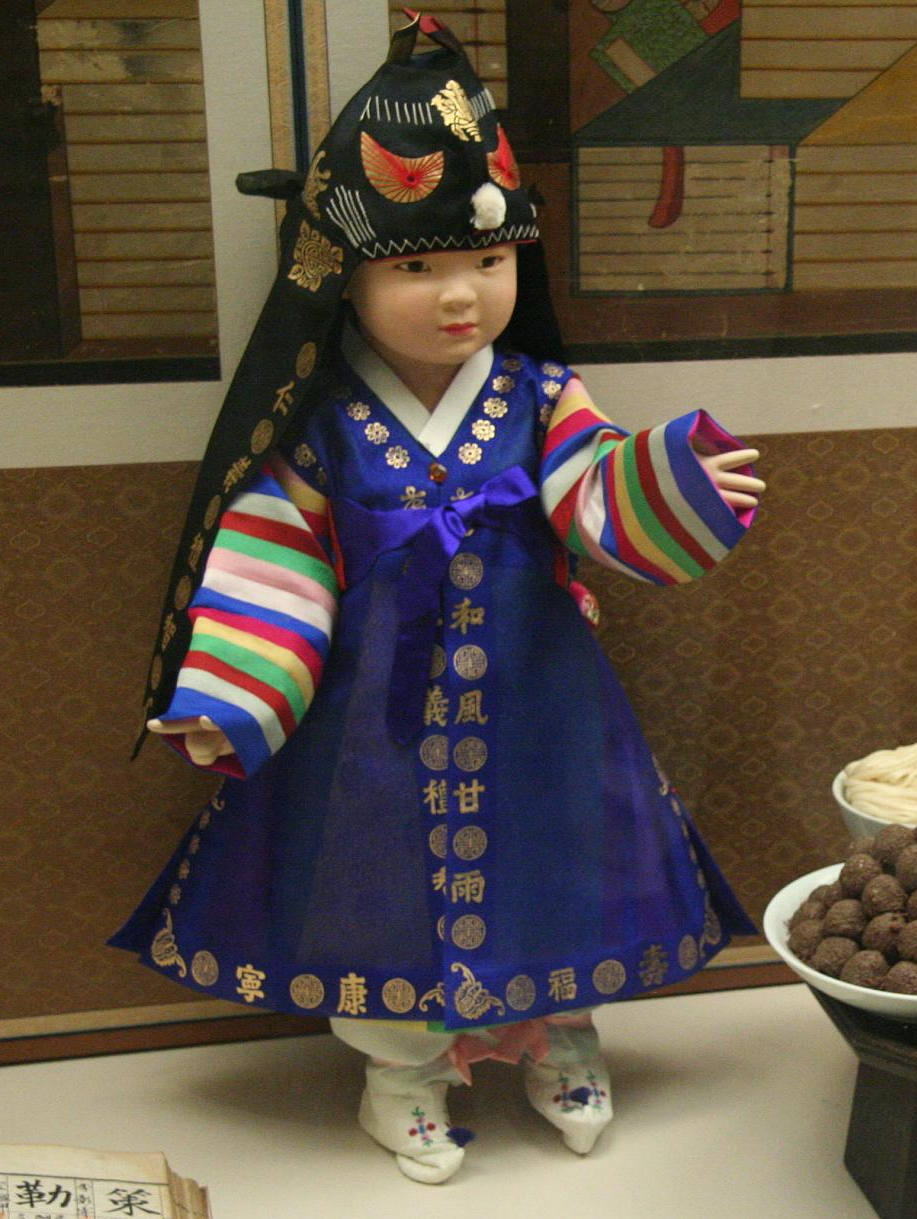
A mannequin wearing a blue jeonbok over a kkachi durumagi, and baji (pants), hogeon (a hat) on the head and beoseon (socks) on the feet

The name is composed of the two words in Korean; kkachi referring to Korean magpie and durumagi, a type of overcoat. In Korean mythology, magpies are regarded as auspicious messenger delivering good news but also a provider of prosperity and development. The date before Seollal has been referred to as "Kkachi Seollal" (kkachi's New Year's Day). The overcoat was named after the bird to reflect the folk belief because children longed for the cheerful holiday's coming.

Kkachi durumagi is also called obangjang durumagi because it is composed of five colors, representing five different directions (obang) – east (blue), west (white), south (red), north (black), center (yellow). The concept is based on Oriental philosophy.

Seop (섶), the overlapped column of the garment in the center is made of a yellow fabric while gil (길), the large section of the garment on both front and back sides is made of a fabric in yellowish green. For boys, blue color is used for the portions called git (깃, a band of fabric that trims the collar), goreum (고름, strings at chest), doltti (돌띠, embroidered belt) respectively and purple is used for mu (무, gusset). On the other hand, kkachi durumagi for girls has red or purple colored git, goreum and doltti and dark blue mu. The sleeves are made of two sheets of fabrics. The outer surface is made of a yellowish green fabric or saekdong (colorful stripes) fabric whereas the inner is rose pink in color.

In old days, kkachi durumagi were worn as seolbim (설빔), new clothing and shoes prepared for Seollal, while at present, it is used as a dorot, a ceremonial garment for doljanchi, a celebration for a baby's first birthday.

== See also ==
- Durumagi
- Saekdongot
- Jeogori, a Korean short jacket
- Dopo
- Sagyusam
- List of Korean clothing
