= Kachi =

Kachi , Kacchi, Kachhi or Katchi may refer to:

== Places in Iran ==
- Kachi, Ardestan, a village in Isfahan Province
- Gachi, Fars, a village in Fars Province
- Keychi, Isfahan, a village in Isfahan Province

== Places in South Asia ==
- Kacchi Plain, an area in Balochistan, Pakistan
  - Kacchi (Kalat), an ethnic Sindhi division of the former princely state of Kalat in Balochistan
  - Kachhi District, a district in modern-day Balochistan, Pakistan
  - Battle of Kachhi, fought in 1729
- Kachhi (Punjab), Pakistan
- Kachi, Haripur, a village in Khyber Pakhtunkhwa, Pakistan
- Kachi, old name of Kanchipuram city in Tamil Nadu, India

== Other uses ==
- Kutchi language, an Indo-Aryan language of Gujarat and Sindh
  - Kutchi people
- Kachhi (caste), a caste of the Indian states of Madhya Pradesh, Rajasthan and Uttar Pradesh
- Kacchi, a variety of the Thali dialect of Pakistan
- "Katchi" (song), a 2017 song by Nick Waterhouse and remixed by Ofenbach

== People with the name ==
- Hideo Kachi, (born 1953), Japanese musician
- Kachi A. Ozumba, Nigerian-born writer

== See also ==
- Kechi (disambiguation)
- Kutchi (disambiguation)
- Kachee, a community of Tibetan Muslims
- Cachi (disambiguation)
- Kkachi durumagi, traditional Korean overcoat
