= Saekdongot =

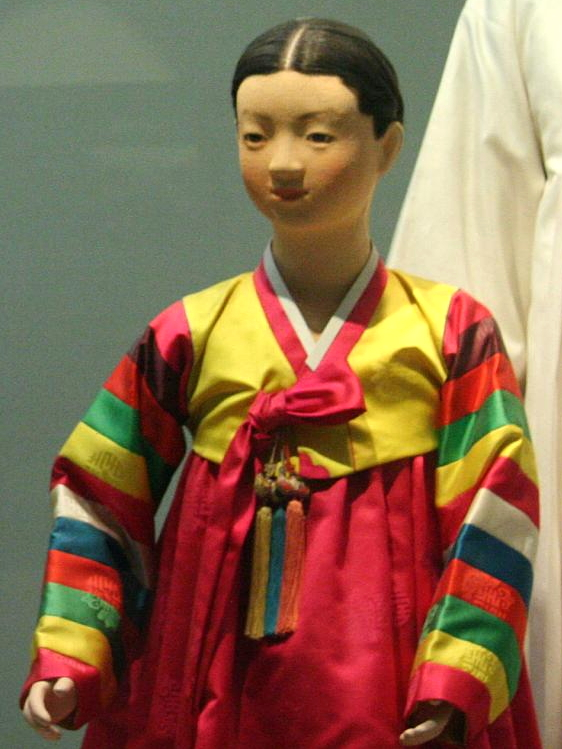
- Saekdong jeogori

Korean name
- Hangul: 색동옷
- Hanja: 色동옷
- RR: saekdongot
- MR: saektongot

The saekdongot is a type of hanbok, Korean traditional clothing, with colorful stripes by patchworking. It began to be used for hanbok since the Goryeo period (918 – 1392). The name literally means "many colored (saekdong) clothes (ot)" in Korean. Saekdong reminds one of the rainbow, which in turn evokes thoughts of children's pure dreams. It was usually worn by children from the age of one to seven year old. Such appliances of saekdong has been used throughout hanbok such as jeogori (a short jacket with sashes), magoja (a buttoned jacket), durumagi (an overcoat) and among other garments.

== Gallery ==
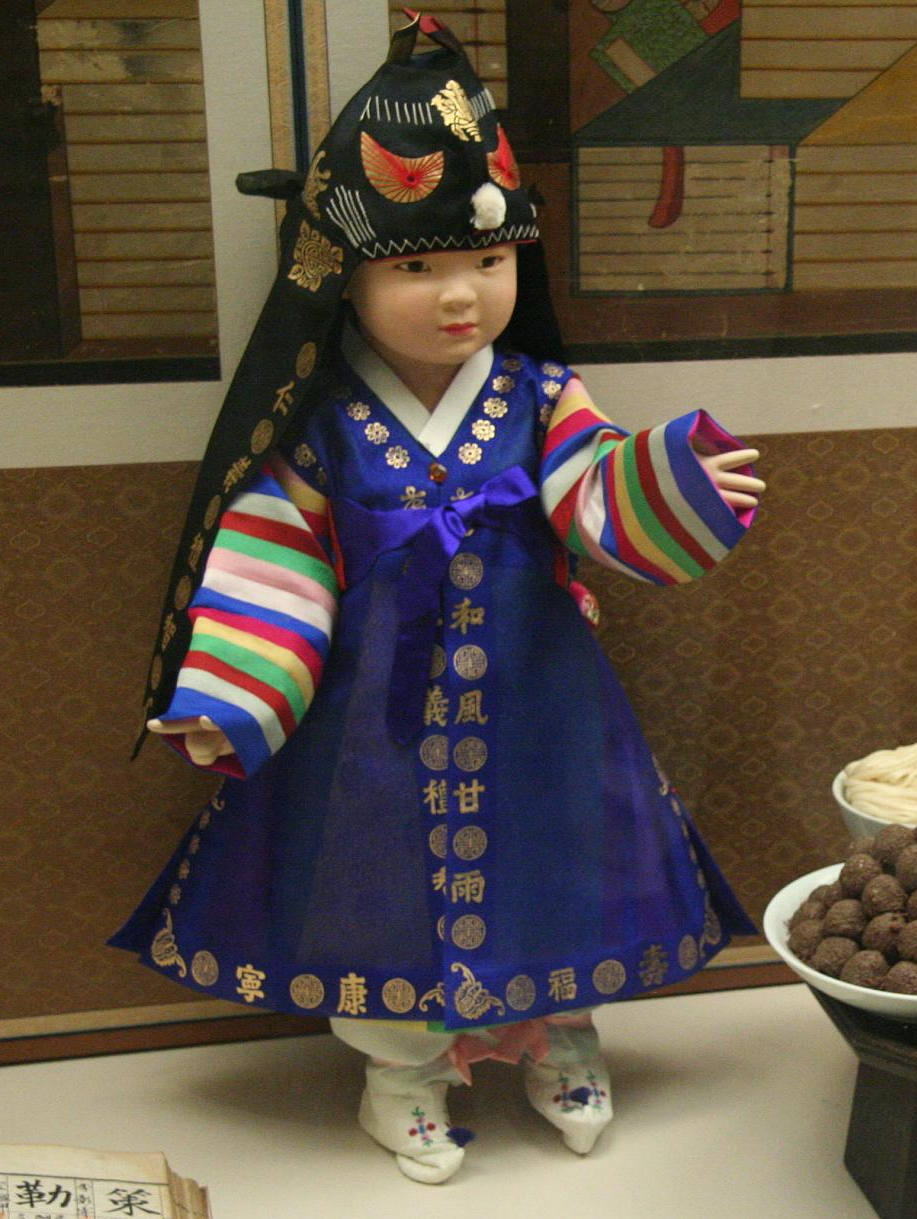
Saekdong jeogori worn by a young boy

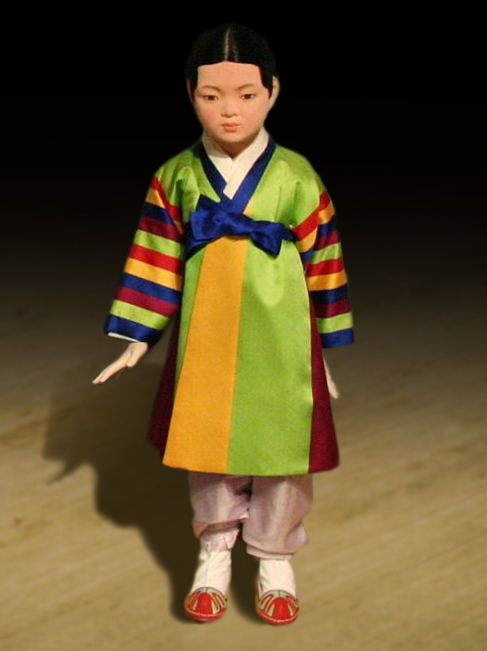
Kkachi durumagi

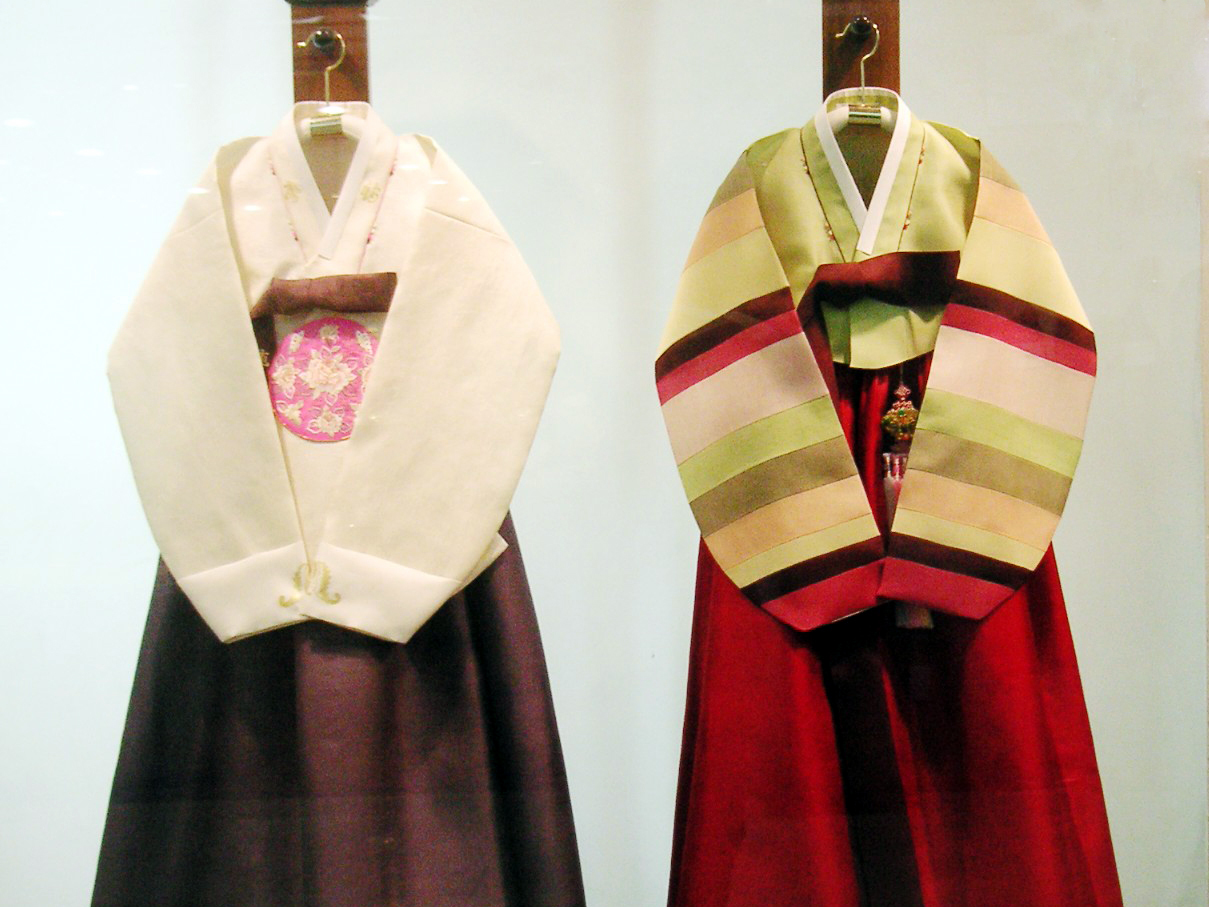
Saekdong jeogori for female adults on the right

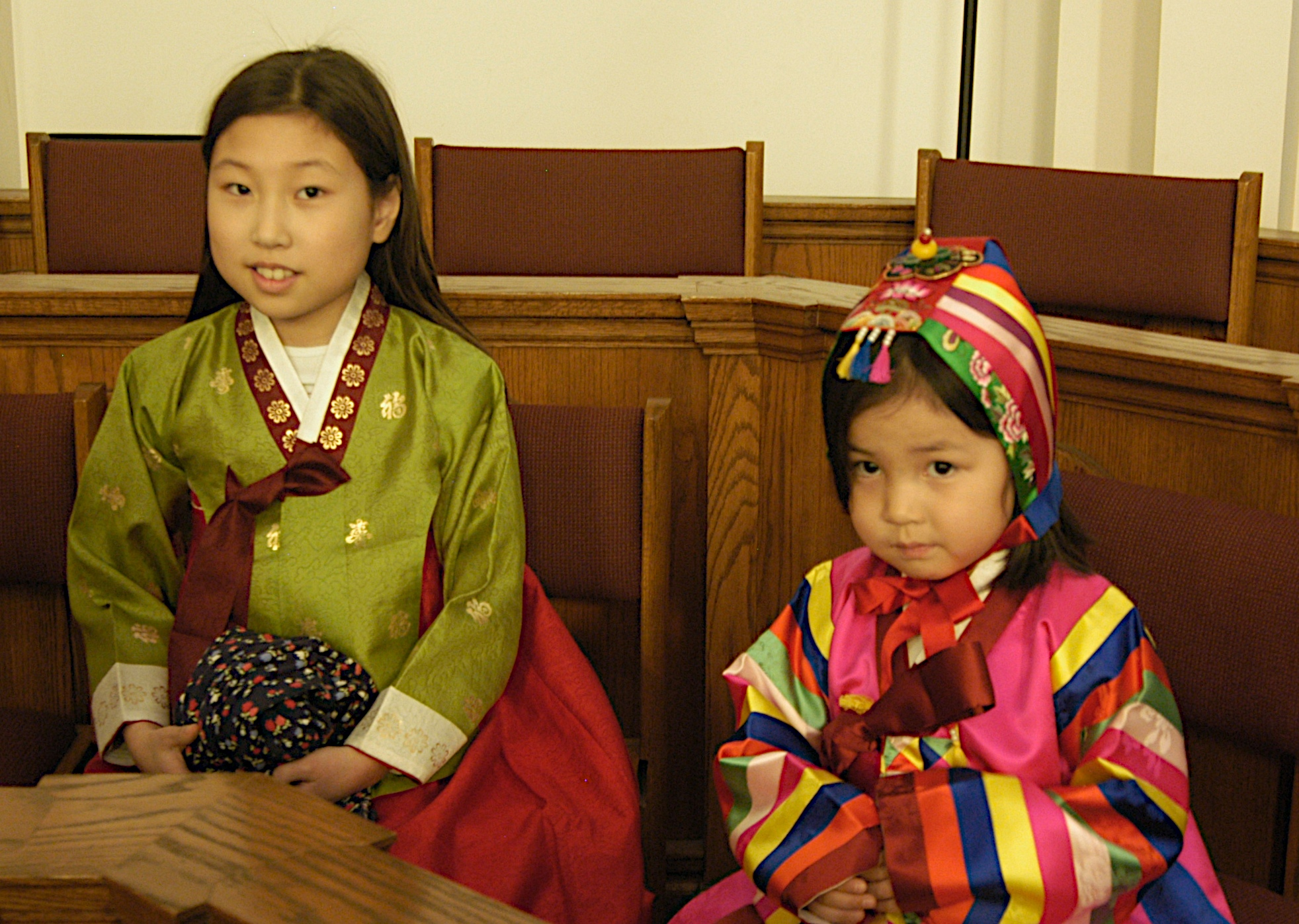
Saeongdong jeogori and saekdong gulle (hat)

== See also ==
- Gulle, a colorful headgear for children
- List of Korean clothing
