= Doljanchi =

Traditional Korean first birthday party

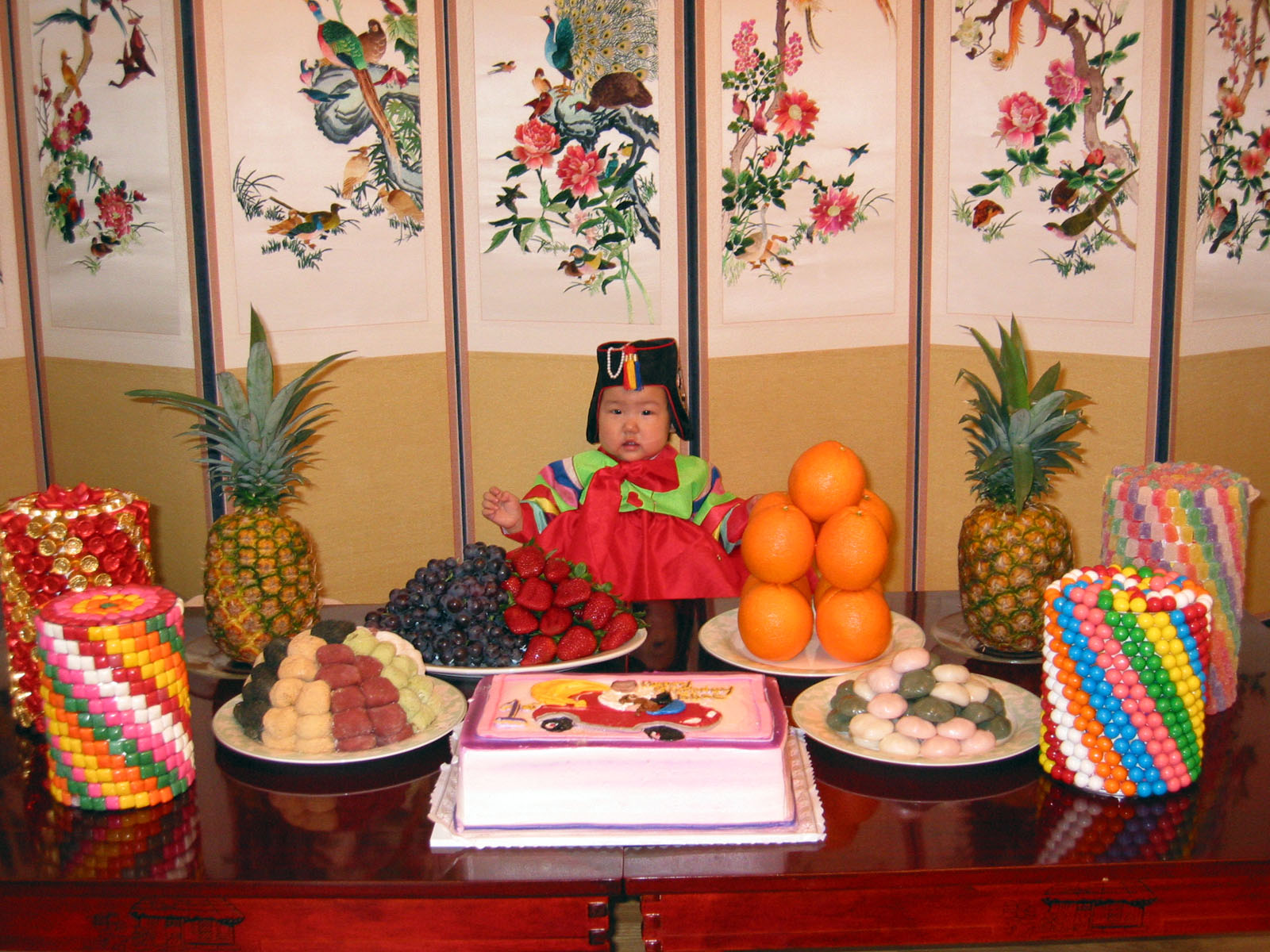
- A doljanchi being held for a child (2007)

Korean name
- Hangul: 돌; 돌잔치
- RR: dol; doljanchi
- MR: tol; toljanch'i

North Korean spelling
- Hangul: 돐; 돐잔치
- RR: dol; doljanchi
- MR: tol; toljanch'i

Dol (Korean: 돌) or doljanchi (돌잔치) is a Korean tradition that celebrates a baby's first birthday.

The tradition has been practiced since the early Joseon period. The ceremony typically involves the ritual offering of a samsinsang to the god Samsin (who is said to watch over children), the preparation of a dolsang with various foods and ritual objects, and a doljabi (based on the Chinese zhuazhou), where children are encouraged to pick up an object that is said to predict their future.

The practice has changed over time. Traditionally, the doljanchi was held at the family home and involved a number of ritual offerings. Now, the practice is often held at reserved venues and is celebrated as a secular party. Its practice has also spread internationally with the Korean diaspora.

== Background ==
Dol is a native Korean measure word for a child's age.

First birthdays for children have been consistently cherished in Korea. This was especially so in the past, when infant mortality rates were high. Across social classes and generations, the doljanchi has marked a significant milestone for families, and involves celebrations and rituals that express hope for the child's health and future.

== Description of traditional practice ==
=== Preparation ===
Traditionally, on the morning of the ceremony, the family prepares a ritual food offering called samsinsang (삼신상; 三神床). The offering is dedicated to a god called Samsin, who is said to watch over the wellbeing of children. The most basic form of the offering consists of miyeok-guk, rice, and ritually pure water (정화수), and is placed by the mother of the child in generally the anbang (private room for women). The family then eats a meal of miyeok-guk and rice.

The child is then dressed in ornate traditional Korean clothing. Boys wear jeogori, baji, jokki, magoja, durumagi, and blue kwaeja, as well as a bokgeon on their head and beoseon on their feet. Girls wear a colorful jeogori (sometimes a dangui) with a red chima. On their head they wear a jobawi or gulle, and on their feet they wear tarae beoseon. All children wear a doltti around their chest and doljumeoni on their waist.

Guests are invited to the doljanchi. The guests generally bring gifts for the child and family, including money, rice, thread, silverware, furniture such as tables, blankets, jewelry, and clothing. One traditional gift is a dolbanji, a solid gold ring. This custom originated from Chinese immigrants to Korea in the early 20th century.

=== Dolsang ===
A dolsang (돌상; 돌床; lit. 'dol table') is then prepared, and traditionally placed in either the anbang or the daecheong (common floor space of the household). The table itself is traditionally round (둥근상; 原盤), in order to avoid having corners that the child can bump into. A byeongpung (Korean folding screen) is often placed behind the table. The table usually has two types of objects: ritual objects and food. The ritual objects are relevant for the doljabi ceremony.

Foods are piled high in decorative fashion on the table. Examples of foods include fruit, vegetables, grilled foods, rice, noodles, miyeok-guk, jeon, yakgwa, and gangjeong. Particularly popular, and increasingly so in recent years, are rice cakes: songpyeon, baekseolgi, gaepi-tteok, red bean gyeongdan, and injeolmi. These foods can have various symbolic meanings. For example, baekseolgi can express wishes for a clean and pure spirit. Songpyeon, which look plump, can express wishes that the child will always be well fed. Red bean gyeongdan symbolize warding off bad luck.

=== Doljabi ===
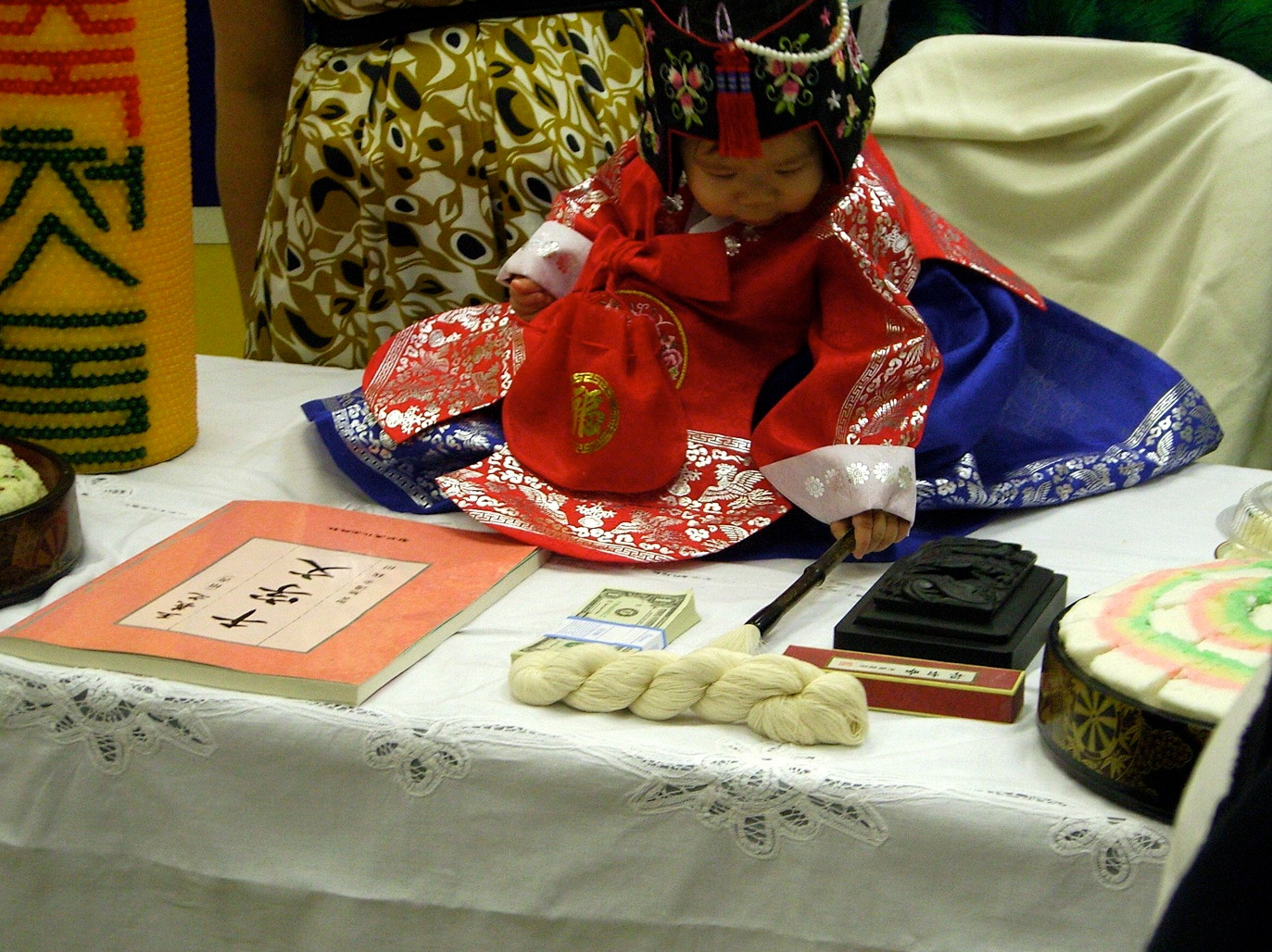
A child picking up a brush in a doljabi ceremony (2007)

Doljabi (돌잡이) is a ritual ceremony held during the doljanchi. The child is placed in front of the dolsang, and told to pick up any of the various ritual objects on the table. These objects have symbolic meaning; it is believed that whichever object the child picks up first represents what the child will have luck with in the future.

Examples of objects and their meanings include books, ink, brushes, or paper (intelligence and success in the civil service examinations); money (wealth); rice (having enough to eat or wealth); bows or swords (martial talent or bravery), sewing equipment (household skills), and threads or noodles (longevity).

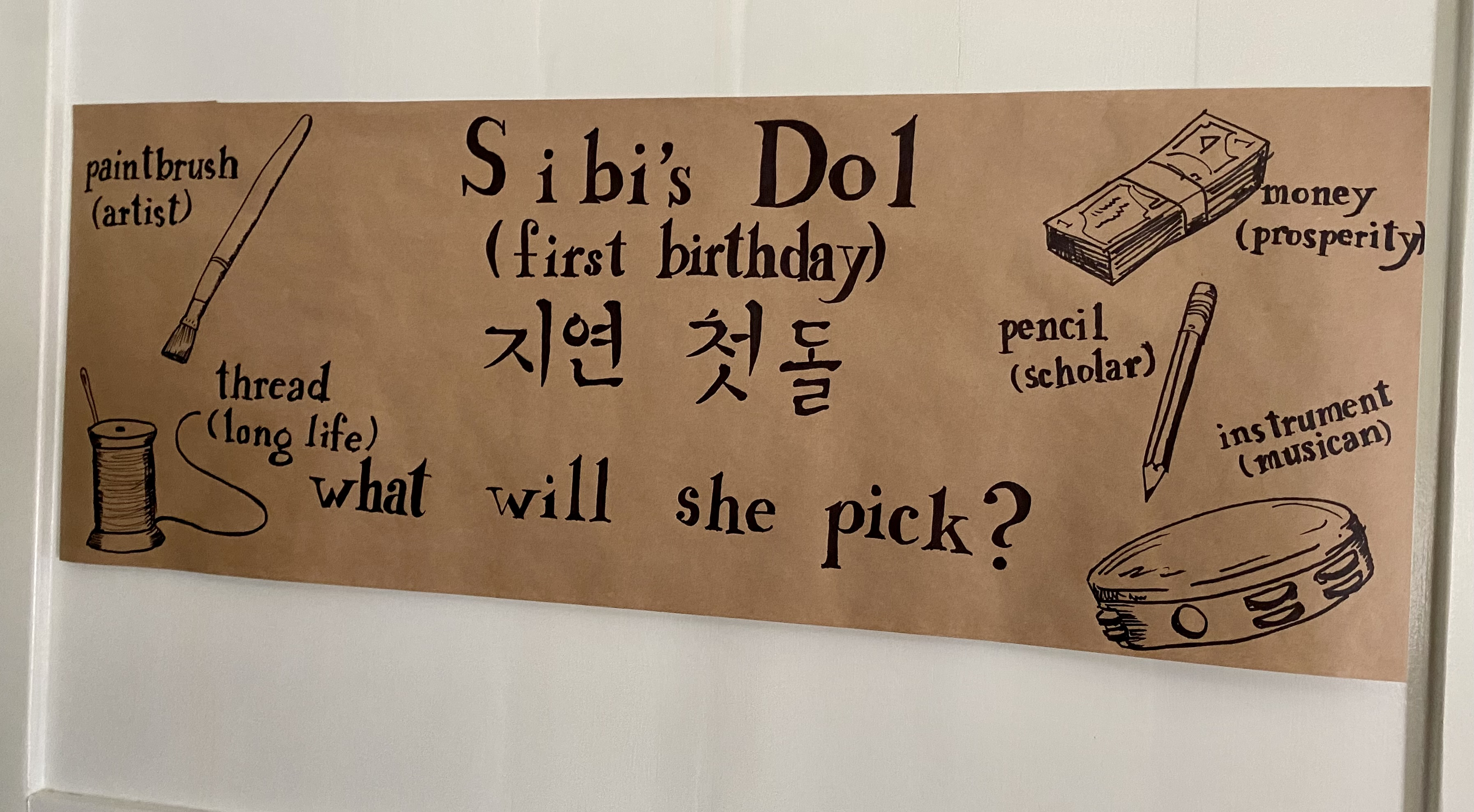
A sign (in English) that encourages guests to guess what object the child will pick (2021)

Parents and relatives often coax the child to choose certain objects, although children do not always follow these wishes.

=== Other traditions ===
After the ceremony, hosts can distribute tteok to their neighbors. In turn, the neighbors can offer their own gifts, such as money, rice, or thread. These gifts were traditionally put inside the same container used to bring the tteok.

== History ==
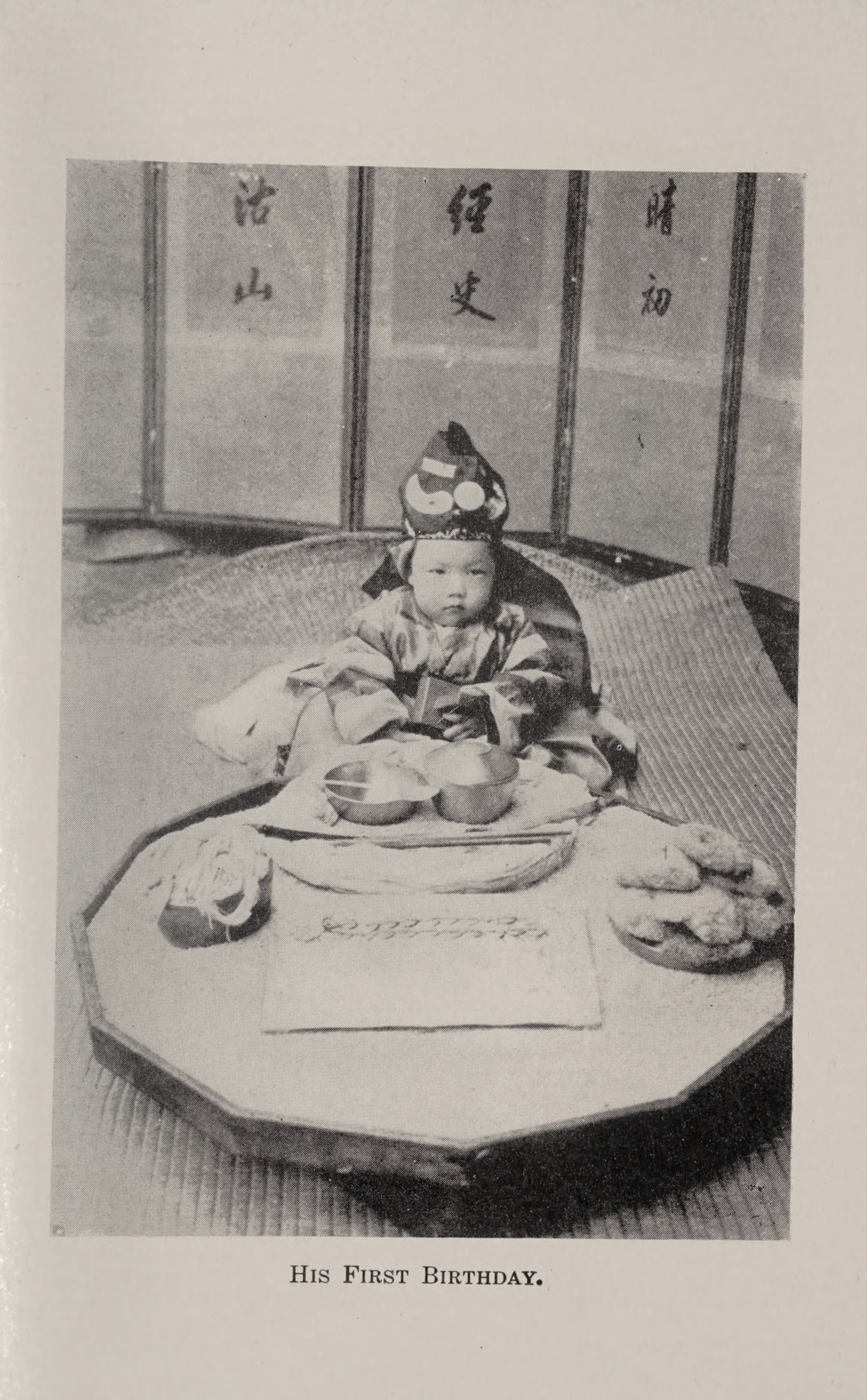
A doljanchi in the early 20th century

The practice emerged possibly around the Joseon period, with early attestations to the practice amongst the yangban class around the mid-16th century. Doljabi, which descends from the Chinese ritual zhuazhou, is attested to during this period. It also became practiced by Korean royalty; in 1791, the future king Sunjo picked up arrows and an instrument during his doljabi. The royal household then distributed rice cakes to government ministers, royal guards, servants, and commoners in the streets. The ceremony is attested to in Joseon-era texts such as the Kukchobogam and Chibong yusŏl.

=== Modern practices ===
The practice and its interpretation has evolved over time, especially as infant mortality is no longer high. The ceremony is now an industry, with various services expressly for the ceremony available. Venues such as hotels and banquet halls can be booked. Recent doljanchi have involved practices such as inviting people to a banquet hall, serving catered food, and hiring professionals such as photographers, stylists, and emcees. Gift bags can be given out to guests. Hanbok can be rented for the ceremonies. Some see the ceremony as an opportunity to demonstrate wealth or status. In response to this, some have intentionally opted to hold more intimate and frugal ceremonies.

Gifts given at doljanchi have also changed over time. Rice and clothes were common gifts until the mid-1950s. In the early 20th century, the practice of giving gold at such ceremonies reportedly arrived from China. In recent years, some have opted to give cash instead of gold, depending on the price of the metal.

Pre-prepared kits for doljanchi have been attested to being sold online, on e-commerce websites such as Amazon and Etsy.

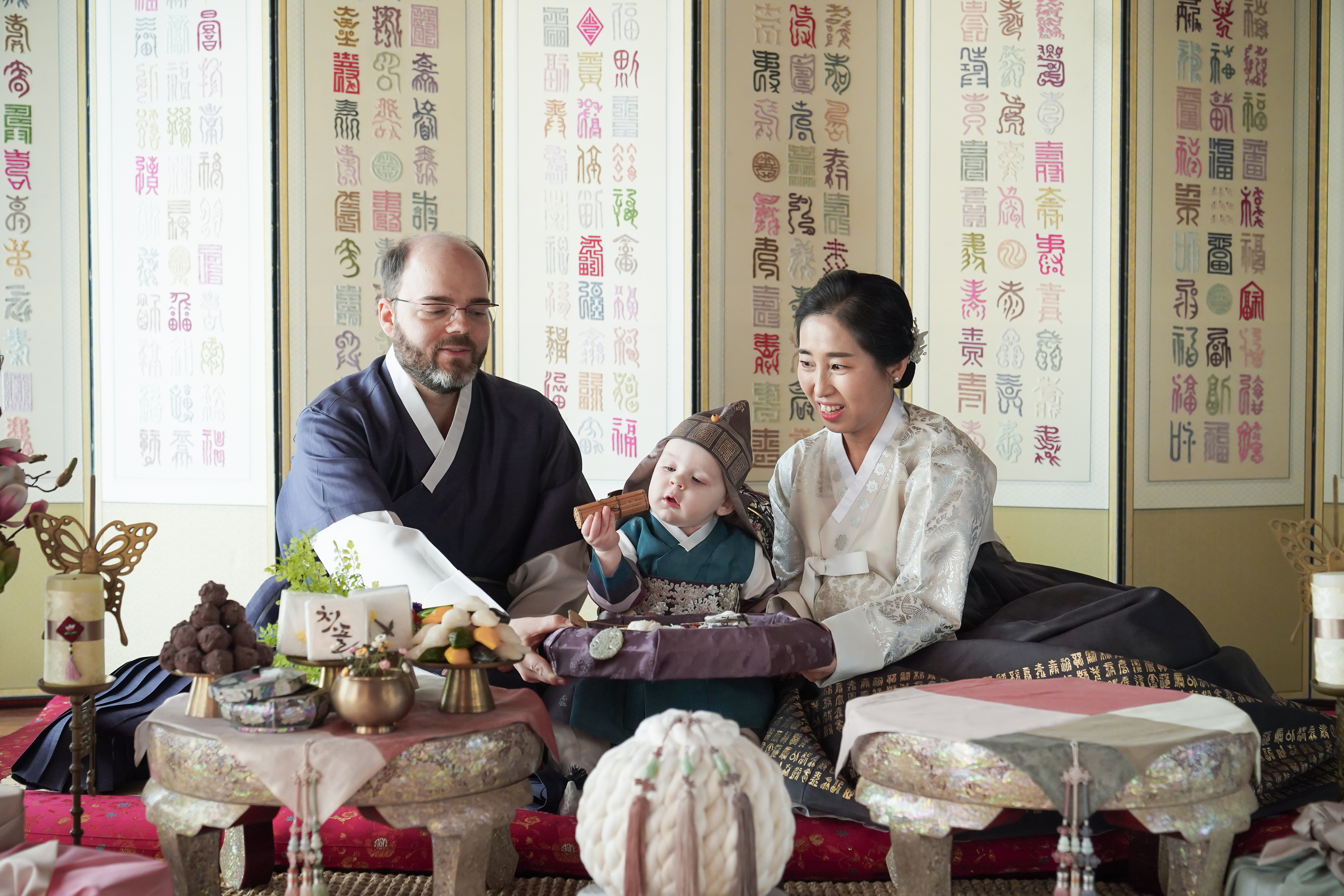
A mixed culture family in a doljanchi photo shoot (2024)

The practice has been observed in the Korean diaspora and in mixed culture families. For example, a Korean American ceremony had the ceremony as an outdoor picnic with a mix of Korean and American foods.

The objects represented in doljabi have varied. Examples include stuffed animal toys (becoming a veterinarian), stethoscopes (becoming a doctor), gavels (becoming a judge), microphones (becoming an entertainer), computer mice (working in tech), and passports (becoming a diplomat).

== See also ==
- Korean birthday celebrations
- East Asian age reckoning
- Agra Hadig, an Armenian ritual similar to doljabi
