= Gachi =

Gachi (Persian: گچي) may refer to:

- Gachi, Fars
- Gachi, Isfahan
- Gachi, Kohgiluyeh and Boyer-Ahmad
- Gachi, Lorestan
- Gachi, West Azerbaijan
- Gachi District, in Ilam Province
- Gachi Rural District, in Ilam Province

== See also ==
- Gachimuchi
