= Hogeon =

Korean traditional headgear for young boys

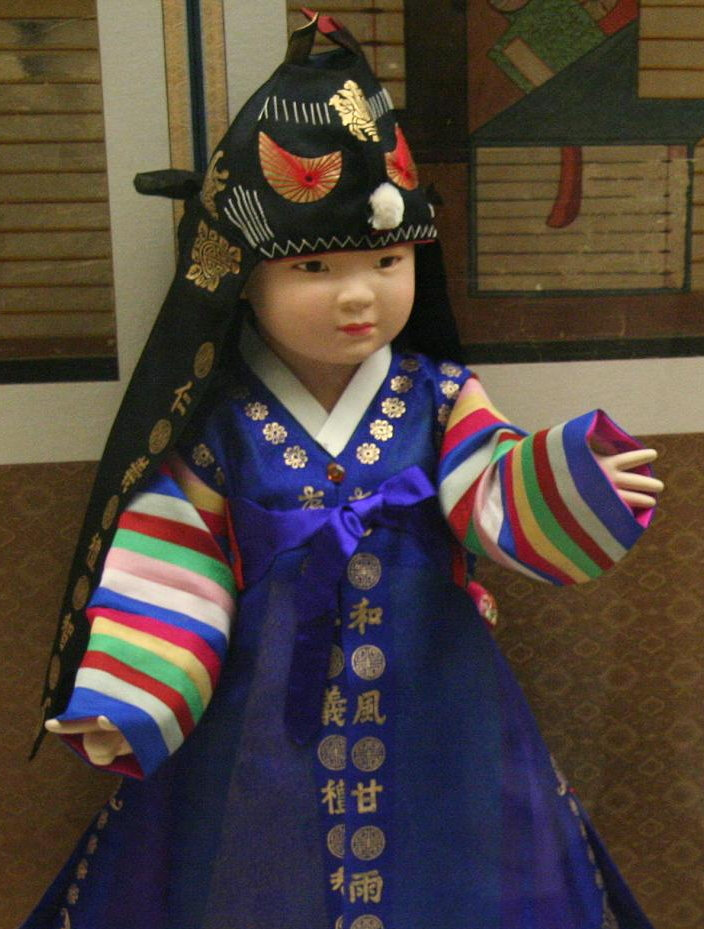

Hogeon
- Hangul: 호건
- Hanja: 李浩建
- RR: hogeon
- MR: hogŏn

A hogeon (Korean: 호건) is a type of gwanmo (관모), Korean traditional headgear for young boys aged one year to five years old. It was worn along with durumagi (overcoat) or jeonbok (a long vest). Hogeon were worn on holidays such as Seollal (Korean new year), Chuseok (Mid-term festival), or celebrations for their birthdays like doljanchi. The shape and material are almost similar to bokgeon except a tiger pattern embroidered on hogeon. The outer is made of a black silk while the inner is dark blue silk. The tiger pattern was embroidered on the surface as reflecting parents' wish for their children to grow brave. The shapes of a tiger's eyebrow, eyes, whiskers, teeth and ears are decorated on the forehead of the hogeon. The ears was made with black and red fabrics. Strings attached to the end of the forehead part is able to tie the headgear to its back. Along with the tiger pattern, geumbak (gold leaf) of some of Hanja that had good and auspicious meaning are adorned with the hogeon to bless the wearer. It was worn by young boys until they reached to the age of five or six years old.

== See also ==
- Ayam
- Bokgeon
- Gulle
- Hanbok
- Jobawi
- Nambawi
