= Kachhi Canal Project =

Canal in Punjab and Baluchistan

- Location: Pakistan: Baluchistan, Punjab,
- Country: Pakistan
- Established: 2002
- Budget: PKR 80 billion
- Status: Completed and Operational (Phase-I only)
- Website: www.wapda.gov.pk

The Kachhi Canal Project is a 499-km long canal project situated in the Baluchistan and Punjab Provinces of Pakistan. It starts from Taunsa Barrage at Indus River and terminates in Baluchistan. The canal provides sustainable irrigation water supply to 720,000 acres of agricultural land in Baluchistan and 30,000 acres of land in Punjab. The cost of the project, after its revision is now Rs.80.5 billion. The water infrastructure and irrigated agriculture in Baluchistan will sizably increase, when Kachhi Canal Project will be completed. The project was started in 2002 and was almost abandoned due to cost and time overruns.

The length of main canal is 399 km, of which 305 km lies in Punjab region whilst 94 km are in Baluchistan. The Kachhi Canal project is divided into three phases.

Phase 1 comprises six sections totaling 399 km: (305 km Punjab, 94 Baluchistan):

1. KC-1 -- 6 KM—Completed.
2. KC-2 -- 20 KM—Completed.
3. KC-3 -- 6 KM—Completed.
4. KC-4 -- 129 KM—Completed.
5. KC-5 -- 144 KM—Completed.
6. KC-6A—49 KM—In Progress.
7. KC-6B—45 KM—In Progress.

Phase 2 comprises one section of 60 km in Baluchistan:

1. KC-7 -- 60 KM—Not Started.

Phase 3 comprises one section of 40 km in Baluchistan:

1. KC-8 -- 40 KM—Not Started.

Total System Length after completion of all phased will be 499 KM [399KM + 60KM+ 40 KM], Baluchistan would get 194 KM, and Punjab will get 304 KM of Canal.

The 399 kilometer long main canal (out of which 351 kilometers is lined) takes off from Taunsa Barrage in Muzaffar Garh district of Punjab province and ends at Dera Bugti district in Baluchistan province. The discharge capacity of the main canal is 6000 cusecs. As many as 914 structures have been constructed at or over the main canal including head and cross regulators, road and railways bridges, cross drainage and escape structures and watercourse crossings etc.

== Construction ==
The project was inaugurated in October 2002 at Taunsa Barrage. Completion of project is scheduled in 3 phases

- Phase-I - in district Dera Bugti (will irrigate 102,000 acres)
- Phase-II - in Bolan District & Naseerabad, Balochistan (will irrigate 267,000 acres)
- Phase-III - in district Bolan, Naseerabad and Jhal Magsi (will irrigate 344,000 acres)

Several revised deadlines for completion of the project have been given in past but the project is not yet completed and work is ongoing at slow pace. Phase-I (Part A&B) was completed in August 2017 and inaugurated on September 14, 2017 by then Prime Minister Mr. Shahid Khaqan Abbasi. When completed, 720,000 acres of virgin land will be irrigated.

Video from the construction on YouTube

== See also ==
- Kachhi
