= Cachi =

Cachi may refer to:

- Cachi, Argentina
- Cachi Department, Argentina
- Cachi, Costa Rica
- Lake Cachi, Costa Rica

== See also ==
- Cachy, a commune in France
- Kachi (disambiguation)
