= Sagyusam =

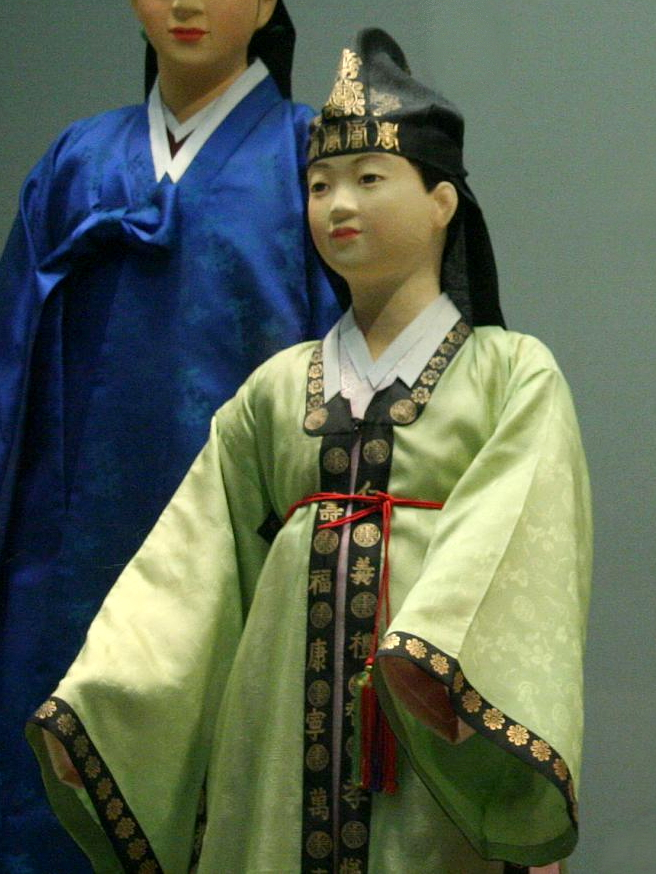

Korean name
- Hangul: 사규삼
- Hanja: 四揆衫
- RR: sagyusam
- MR: sagyusam

The sagyusam is a type of po (포), or outer robe in hanbok, Korean traditional clothing, which was worn by young boys until they had a coming-of-age ceremony called gwallye (관례). The name was derived from the shape; the lower end of the garment is divided into four parts.

== See also ==
- Bokgeon
- Hanbok
- Hogeon
- Jeogori
- List of Korean clothing
