= Hwa =

Traditional Korean boot

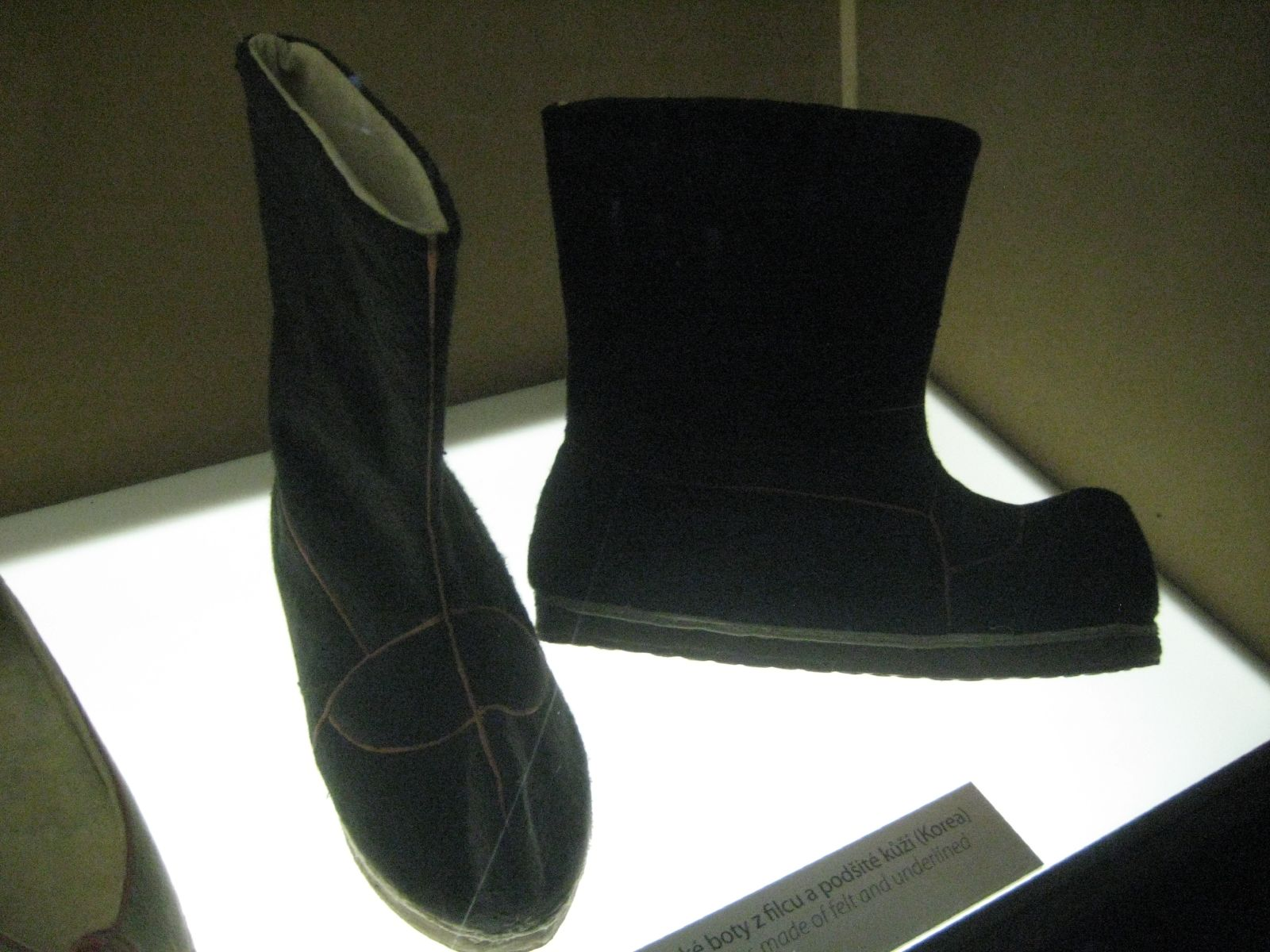

Korean name
- Hangul: 화
- Hanja: 靴, 鞾
- RR: hwa
- MR: hwa

Hwa (Korean: 화) are a type of traditional Korean boot, which, along with 이; i, is a subdivision of Korean shoes. The i refers to all kind of shoes that do not go up to the ankle. Hwa are usually made of leather, and artisans who make the shoes are called 화장; hwajang. Hwa were originally worn by the Northern kingdoms of Korea. The horse-riding cultures of the North appear to have typically worn leather boots (hwa), while the farmers of the South wore shoes of leather or straw (hye). Different types of boots were worn by military and civil officials.

== See also ==
- List of shoe styles
- Beoseon
- Cowboy boot
- Jika-tabi
