= Kechi =

Kechi may refer to:

- Kechi, Isfahan, Iran
- Kechi, Jabal, Iran
- Kechi, Kansas, United States

== See also ==
- Kachi (disambiguation)
