= Yanggwan =

Korean traditional ceremonial hat

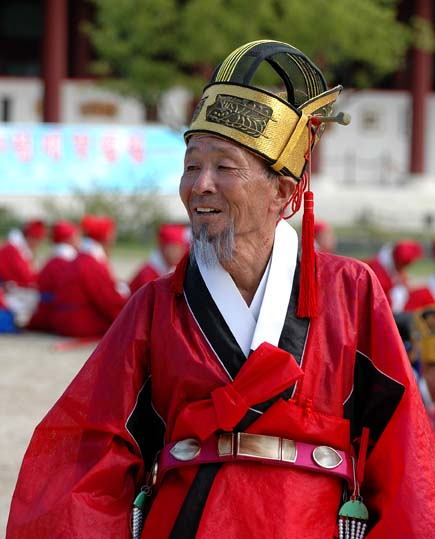

Korean name
- Hangul: 양관
- Hanja: 梁冠
- RR: yanggwan
- MR: yanggwan

A yanggwan (Korean: 양관) is a Korean ceremonial hat originated from China's Liangguan. It is considered a ritual crown.

== See also ==
- Culture of Korea
- List of Korean clothing
