= Kachi, Ardestan =

Kachi كچي
- Village
- Location within Iran
- Coordinates: 32°58′52″N 52°35′27″E
- Country: Iran
- Province: Isfahan
- County: Ardestan
- Bakhsh: Central
- Rural District: Barzavand

Population (2006)
  - Total: 32
- Time zone: UTC+3:30 (IRST)
  - Summer (DST): UTC+4:30 (IRDT)

Kachi (Persian: كچي, also Romanized as Kachī and Kechī) is a village in Barzavand Rural District, in the Central District of Ardestan County, Isfahan Province, Iran. At the 2006 census, its population was 32, in 14 families.
