= Kachi A. Ozumba =

Nigerian writer

Kachi A. Ozumba is a Nigerian-born novelist and short story writer. He won the Arts Council England's Decibel Penguin Prize in 2006 and the Commonwealth Short Story Prize (Africa region) in 2009. His debut novel, The Shadow of a Smile (2009), was shortlisted for the Royal Society of Literature Ondaatje Prize for a distinguished work of fiction, non-fiction or poetry, evoking the spirit of a place and longlisted for the 2010 Desmond Elliott Prize.

Ozumba studied at the University of Ibadan, University of Leeds, and Newcastle University.
