= Magoja =

Korean traditional jacket

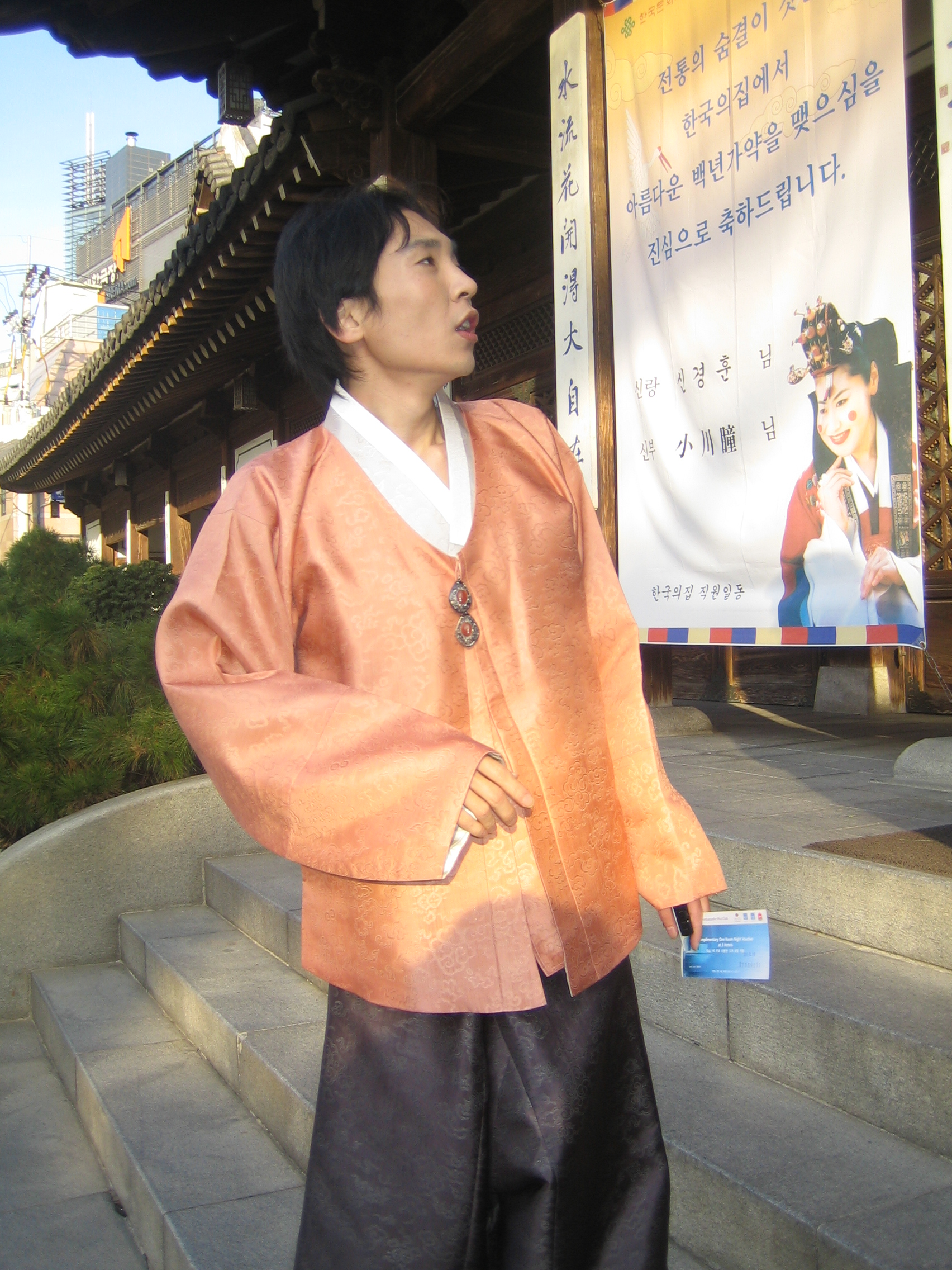

Korean name
- Hangul: 마고자; 마괘
- Hanja: (none); 馬褂
- RR: magoja; magwae
- MR: magoja; magwae

The magoja (Korean: 마고자) is a type of long jacket worn with hanbok, the traditional clothing of Korea, and is usually worn on top of the jeogori (short jacket). It is also called magwae and while it was originally a male garment, it is now considered a unisex article of clothing. The magoja was originally a Manchu style of clothing, but was introduced after Heungseon Daewongun, father of King Gojong, returned from political exile in China in 1887. The magoja is derived from the magwae (magua in Chinese) that he wore at that time to protect against the cold weather of the region. Due to its warmth and the fact that it's easy to wear, the magoja's popularity spread throughout Korea. It is also called "deot jeogori" (lit. 'an outer jeogori').

The magoja does not have git (깃, a band of fabric that trims the collar) or goreum (고름, coat strings), unlike the jeogori and durumagi (overcoat). The men's magoja has seop (섶, overlapped column on the front) and its length is longer than women's magoja, so that both sides are open at the bottom. Most magoja are made of silk and are adorned with one or two buttons which are usually made from amber. In a male magoja, buttons are attached to the right side, while on women's magoja they are attached to the left.

At first, women wore the magoja for style rather than comfort and it was particularly popular among the Kaeseong people. The color for these silk women's magojas tend to be neutral in order to harmonize with other garments such as the jeogori and chima (a voluminous skirt), the two main parts of the female hanbok. In spring and autumn, a pastel tone is used for the women's magoja so that wearers can wear it over a jeogori for style. As for men's magoja worn during spring and summer, jade, green, gray, dark grey are used.

== See also ==
- Hanbok
- Jeogori
- Magua (clothing)
- Po
