= Gachi, Kohgiluyeh and Boyer-Ahmad =

Gachi گچي
- Village
- Location within Iran
- Coordinates: 31°02′33″N 50°34′54″E
- Country: Iran
- Province: Kohgiluyeh and Boyer-Ahmad
- County: Kohgiluyeh
- Bakhsh: Central
- Rural District: Doshman Ziari

Population (2006)
  - Total: 389
- Time zone: UTC+3:30 (IRST)
  - Summer (DST): UTC+4:30 (IRDT)

Gachi (Persian: گچي, also Romanized as Gachī; also known as Gachchī) is a village in Doshman Ziari Rural District, in the Central District of Kohgiluyeh County, Kohgiluyeh and Boyer-Ahmad Province, Iran. At the 2006 census, its population was 389, in 67 families.
