= Gachi, West Azerbaijan =

Gachi گچي
- Village
- Location within Iran
- Coordinates: 37°48′54″N 44°43′24″E
- Country: Iran
- Province: West Azerbaijan
- County: Urmia
- Bakhsh: Sumay-ye Beradust
- Rural District: Sumay-ye Jonubi

Population (2006)
  - Total: 498
- Time zone: UTC+3:30 (IRST)
  - Summer (DST): UTC+4:30 (IRDT)

Gachi (Persian: گچي, also Romanized as Gachī; also known as Gīcheh) is a village in Sumay-ye Jonubi Rural District, Sumay-ye Beradust District, Urmia County, West Azerbaijan Province, Iran. At the 2006 census, its population was 498, in 75 families.
