= Kachi, Haripur =

Kachi
- Location within Pakistan
- Coordinates: 34.8°N 72.57°E
- Country: Pakistan
- Province: Khyber Pakhtunkhwa
- Elevation: 558 m (1,831 ft)
- Time zone: UTC+5 (PST)

Kachi, also spelt Kachhi, is a village of Haripur District in the Khyber Pakhtunkhwa province of Pakistan. It is part of Beer Union Council and is located at 34°8'0N 72°57'0E with an altitude of 558 metres (1833 feet).
