= Kachhi (Punjab) =

The Kachhi (Punjabi and Urdu: کچهی) is a geographical region of Punjab, Pakistan. It lies between the Thal Desert and the part of Chenab which flows after its confluence with the Jhelum River at Atharan Hazari in the Jhang District. Parts of the districts of Kot Addu and Layyah form this region.

== See also ==
- Kacchi Plain, Balochistan
