= Gachi, Fars =

Gachi گچي
- Village
- Location within Iran
- Coordinates: 29°29′51″N 52°33′39″E
- Country: Iran
- Province: Fars
- County: Shiraz
- Bakhsh: Central
- Rural District: Qarah Bagh

Population (2006)
  - Total: 2,226
- Time zone: UTC+3:30 (IRST)
  - Summer (DST): UTC+4:30 (IRDT)

Gachi (Persian: گچي, also Romanized as Gachī; also known as Kachī) is a village in Qarah Bagh Rural District, in the Central District of Shiraz County, Fars province, Iran. At the 2006 census, its population was 2,226, in 532 families.
