= Po (clothing) =

Korean traditional outer robe

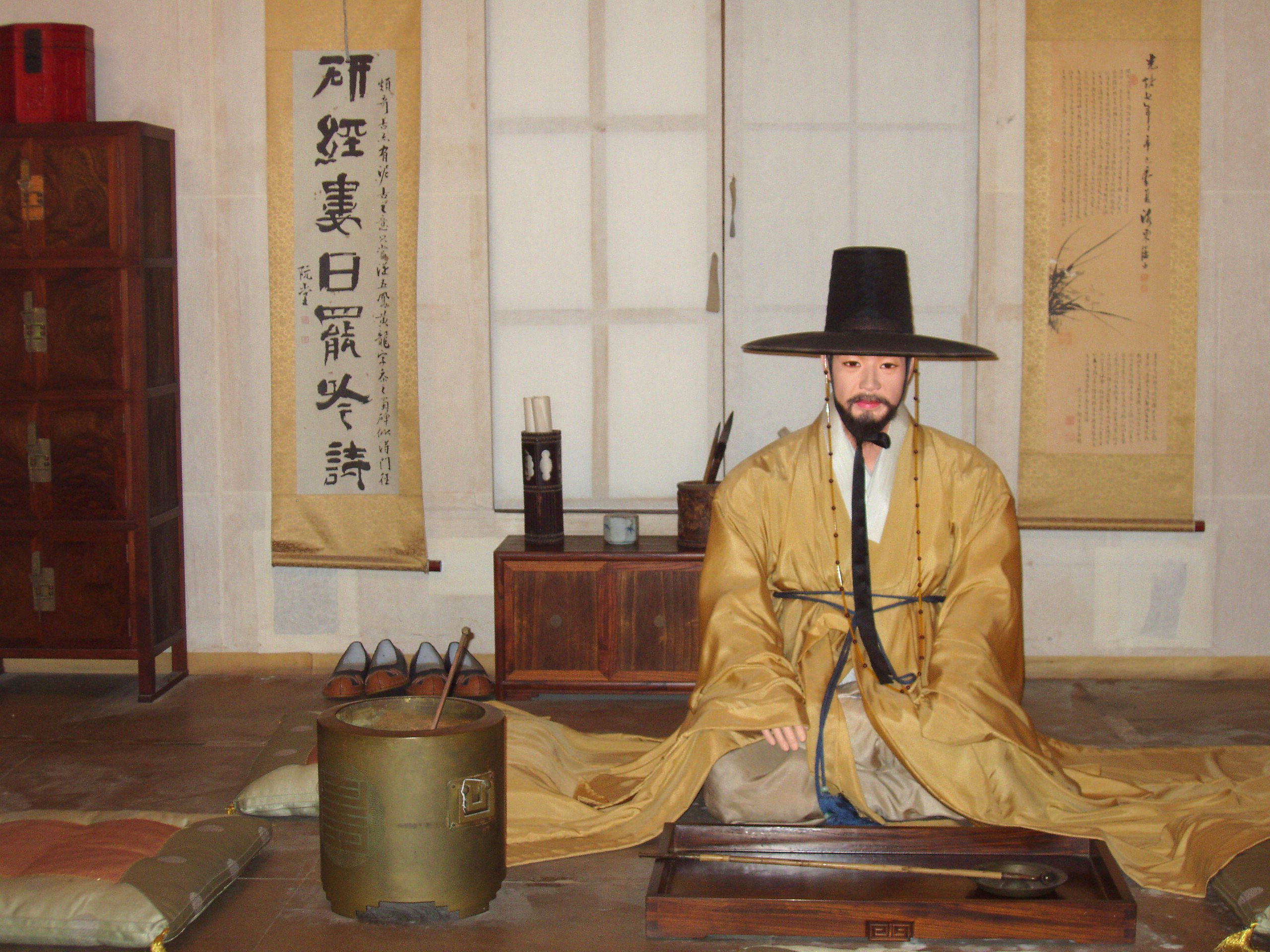

Korean name
- Hangul: 포
- Hanja: 袍
- RR: po
- MR: p'o

Po is a general term that describes an outer robe or overcoat in Korean traditional clothing.

== Description ==
There are two general types of po, the Korean type and the Chinese type.

The Korean type is a common style from the Three Kingdoms of Korea period, and it is used in modern day. A belt was used until it was replaced by a ribbon during late Joseon dynasty. Durumagi is a variety of po that was worn as protection against cold. It had been widely worn as an outer robe over jeogori and baji. It is also called jumagui, juchaui, or juui.

The Chinese type is different styles of po from China. Starting from North-South states period, they were used through history until nation-wide adoption of the Korean type durumagi in 1895.

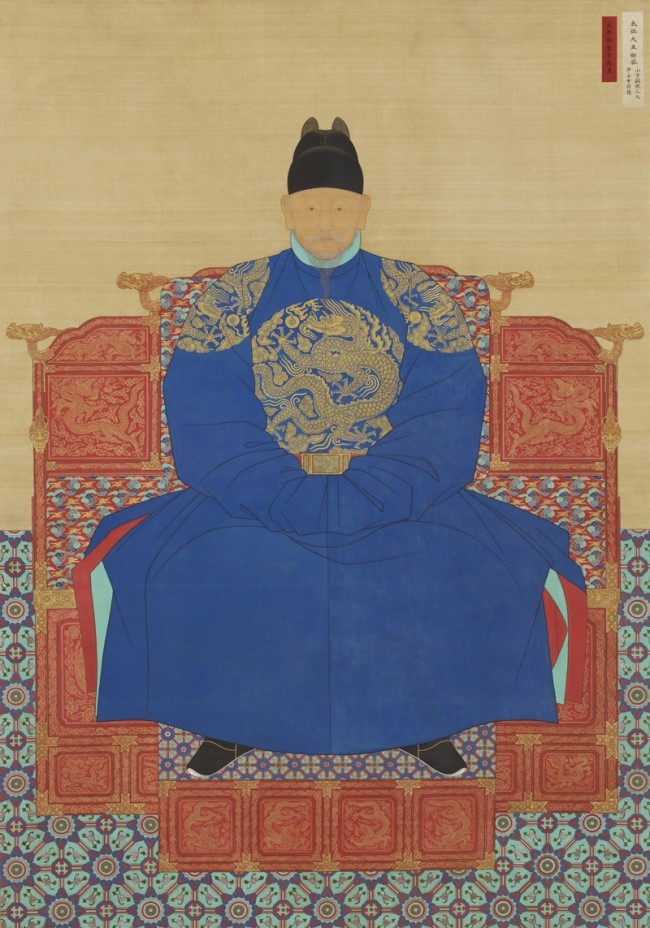
Dragon robe (or ikseongwanpo): business attire for kings

Hongryongpo: everyday clothes for kings

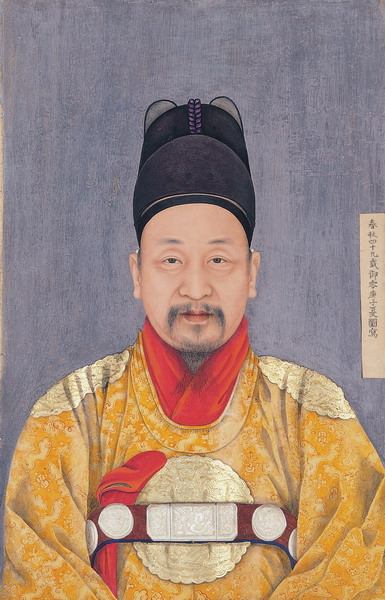
Hwangryongpo: everyday clothes for Sinosphere emperors, styled after the Chinese imperial robe. Once restricted to Chinese emperors, Gojong began to wear the yellow robe after establishing the Korean Empire.

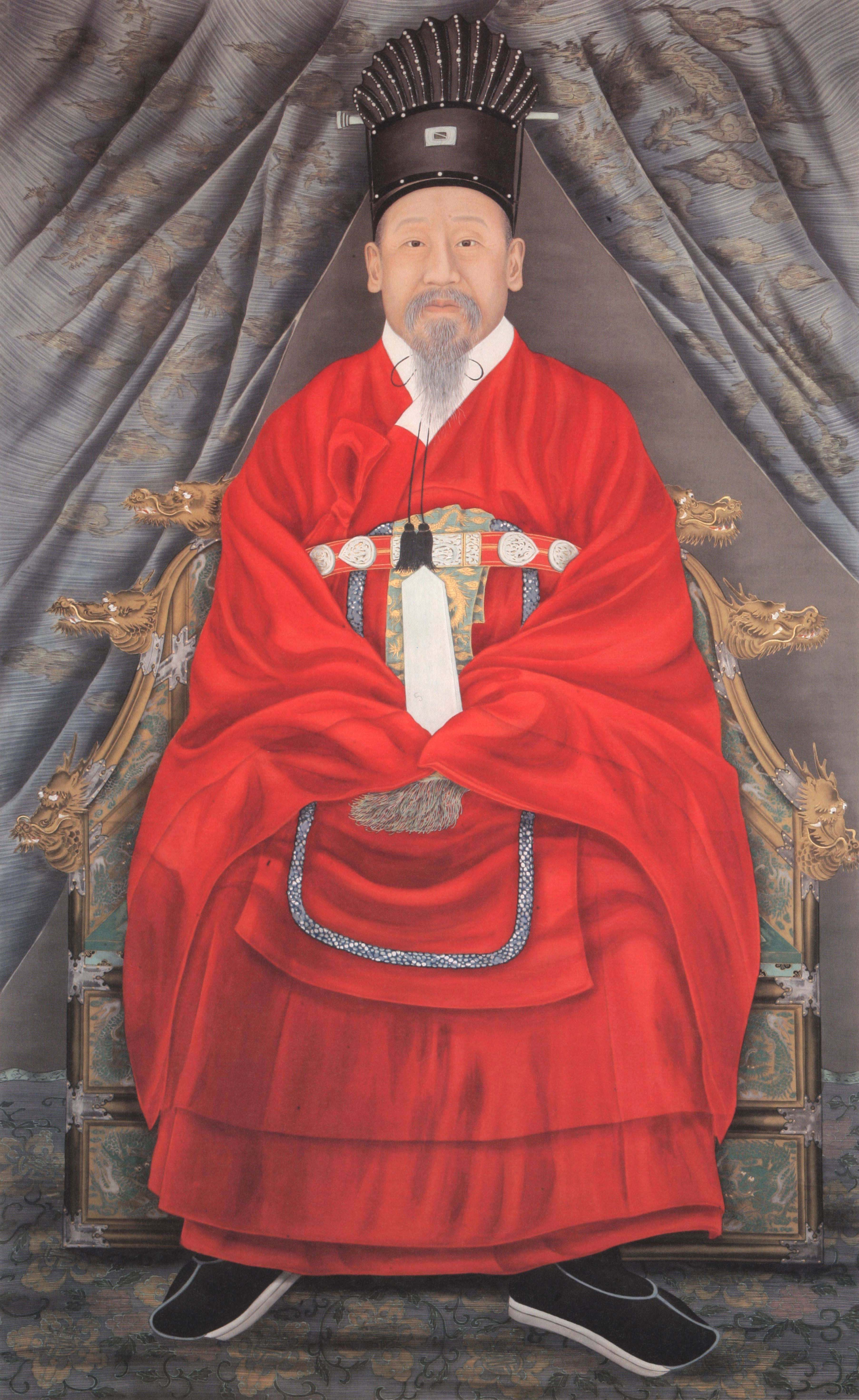
Tongcheongwan and Gangsapo

== Types ==
- Changeui (창의, 氅衣)
- Cheollik
- Danryeongpo (단령포/團領袍) – a type of round collar robe, worn by men and women.
- Dapho – a short sleeved overcoat.
- Dopo (도포/道袍) – a type of cross-collar robe worn by the seonbi and the noblemen.
- Durumagi (두루마기/周衣/周莫衣)
- Goryeongpo – Korean term for the Dragon robe.
- Jang-ot (장옷/長衣) – a representative overcoat form women in early Joseon; it later became a form of headdress.
- Jangsam (장삼/長衫)
- Jikryunpo (直領袍) – a robe with a straight neckline.

== Gallery ==
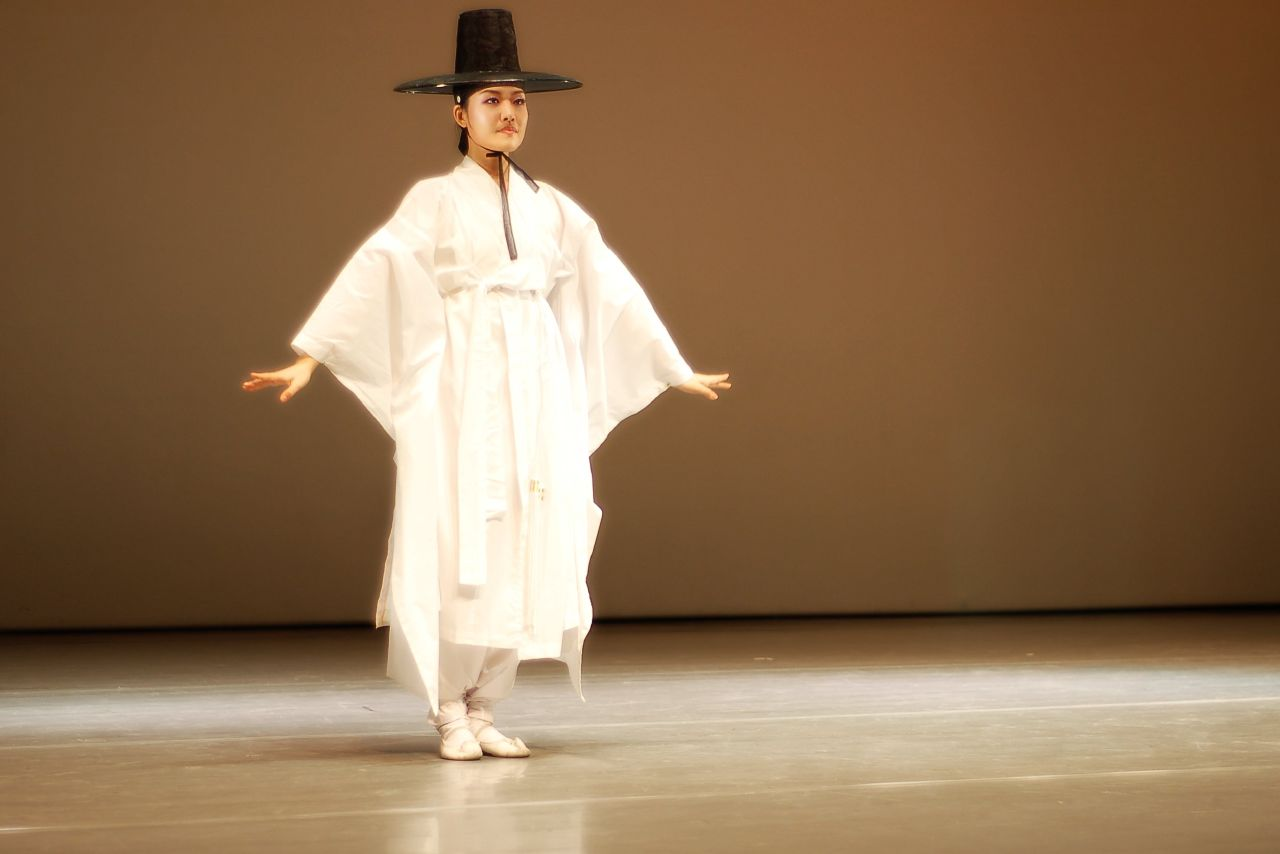

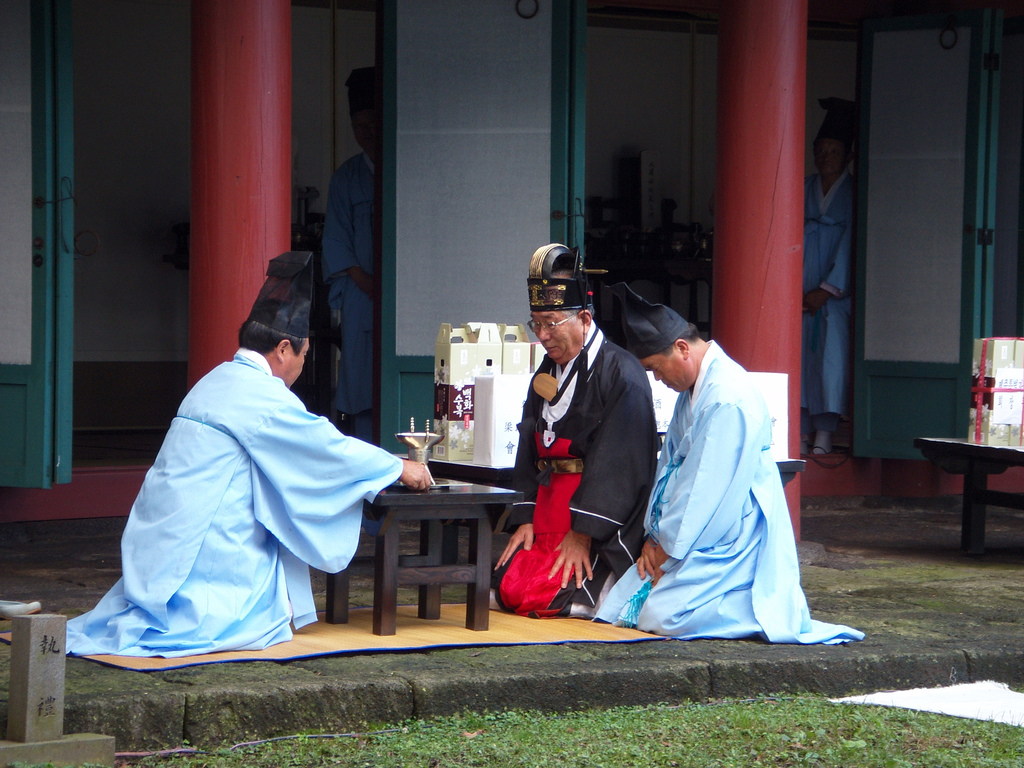

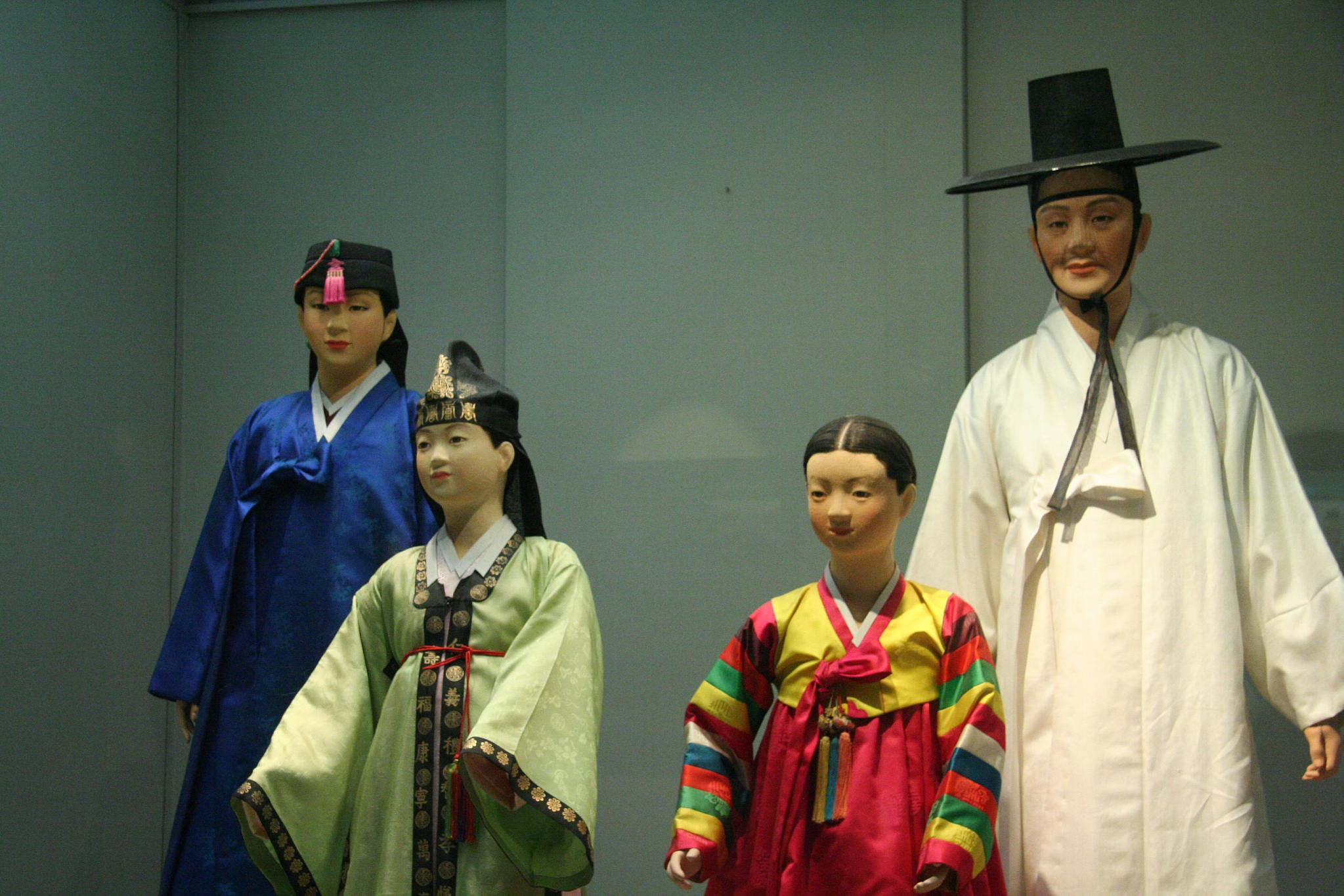

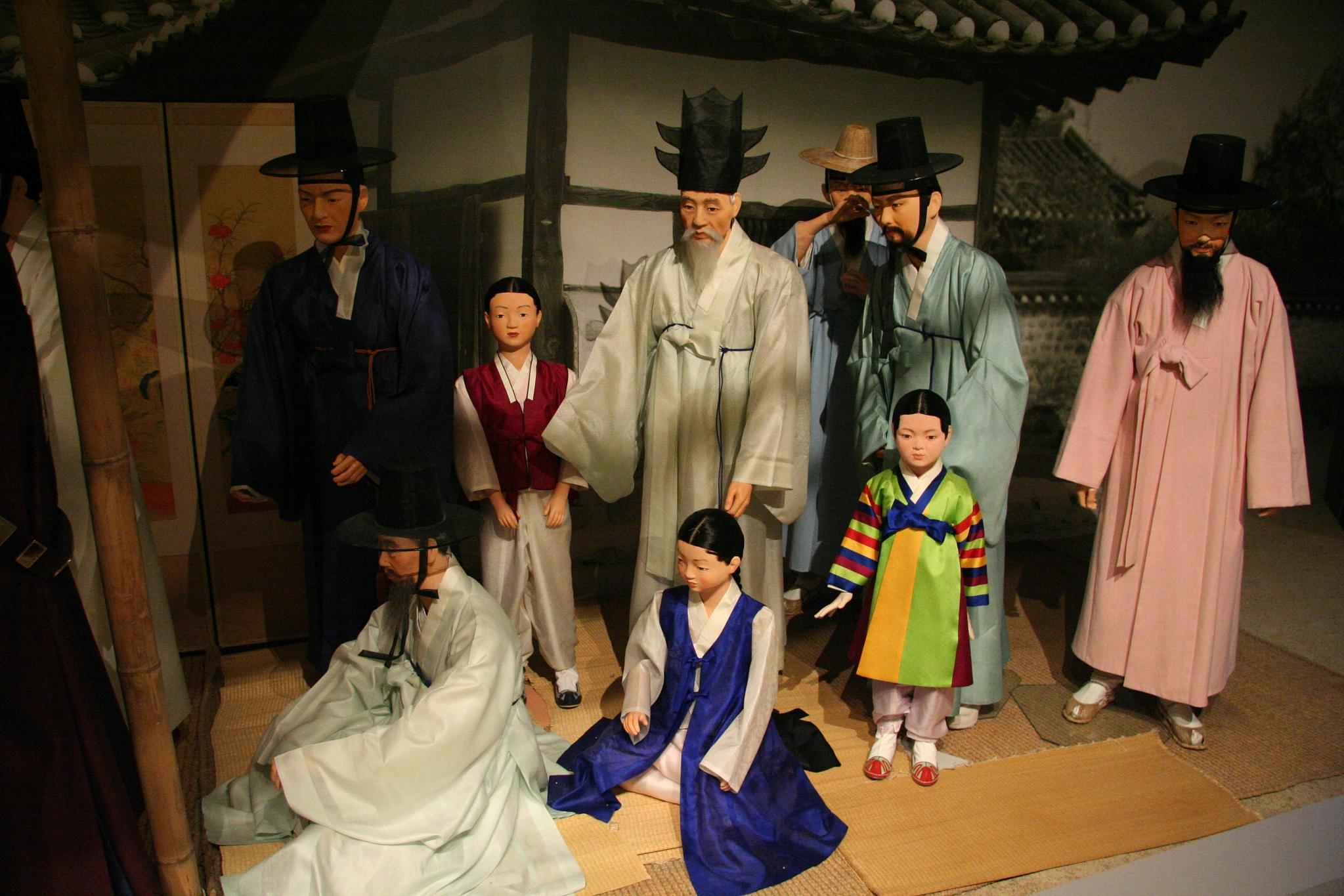

== See also ==
- Durumagi
- Hanbok
- Jeogori
- Jeonbok
- Sagyusam
