= Durumagi =

Korean overcoat with no back or side vents

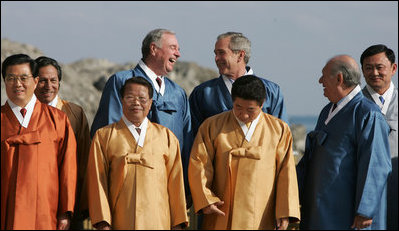
- Various world leaders wearing durumagi in 2005
- Type: Po (Overcoat), Hanbok
- Material: Various
- Place of origin: Korea

- Durumagi
- Hangul: 두루마기
- RR: durumagi
- MR: turumagi

Other names
- Hangul: 주막의; 주차의; 주의
- Hanja: 周莫衣; 周遮衣; 周衣
- RR: jumagui; juchaui; juui
- MR: chumagŭi; chuch'aŭi; chuŭi

Durumagi (Korean: 두루마기; lit. 'closed all around') is a variety of po, or overcoat, in hanbok, the traditional Korean attire. It is a form of outerwear that is usually worn as the topmost layer of clothing over a jeogori (jacket) and baji (pants).

It also goes by the names jumagui (주막의; 周莫衣), juchaui (주차의; 周遮衣), or juui (주의; 周衣),

The name Durumagi is derived from the fact that it is 'closed all around,' distinguishing it from other types of po which typically have slits.

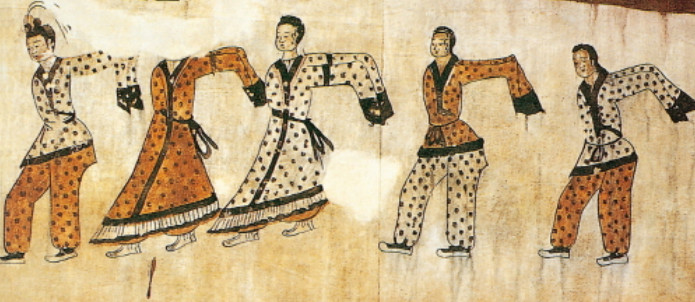
Within the 5th-century tomb murals of the Goguryeo Kingdom, certain dancing figures are portrayed in the Durumagi, a traditional Korean outer robe rooted in the attire of northern nomadic peoples.

Originating from the Hobok(호복, attire of the northern nomads), the Durumagi has been worn from the Three Kingdoms period to the present day. Once a narrow-sleeved everyday garment, it was elevated to ceremonial status during the reign of King Gojong of the Joseon Dynasty. For the first time in history, it became a formal outfit worn equally by everyone, regardless of gender, age, or social status.

== History ==
The origin of durumagi traces back to at least the Three Kingdoms of Korea, where it originated from a long coat worn by the northern nomadic peoples to fend off cold weather in ancient times.

According to Samuel Lee, the origins of the durumagi can be traced back to the Goguryeo period:

"[Goguryeo] Murals also show that both men and women wore chima. The type worn by both for formal occasions was sang and that worn only by women was goon, which had long and wide dimensions. The origin of durumagi, the long outer coat worn over a jeogori, goes back to the Goguryeo period. The durumagi emanates form the long coat worn by northern nomadic people to fend off cold weather in ancient times. The long coat reached mid-calf and had bindings similar to those used for jeogori. Later, this [long coat] was adopted by the Goguryeo upper class in various forms for ceremonies and rituals, and the modified form worn by the general populace came to be known as durumagi.

However, what is now known as the durumagi is part of the indigenous attire of the Korean people:

한국 민족의 고유복식은 저고리와 바지, 두루마기로 돼 있다. 이런 복식은 북방 호복(胡服, Hufu)계열로 바지를 착용했다는 것은 기마민족(騎馬民族)이었음을 의미한다는 것이다.
The traditional clothing of the Korean people consists of a jeogori, baji, and a durumagi. This kind of attire is related to the northern hobok, and wearing pants means that they were a horse-riding people.

Based on the Goguryeo mural paintings found near Pyeongyang, such as the early 5th century murals from Gamsinchong (龕神塚), the ancient durumagi worn by the owner of Gamsinchong tomb was red (or purple) in colour:

[The tomb of the owner of Gamsinchong Tomb] is sitting on a flat bench under a red curtain, in a purple durumagi (a traditional Korean men’s overcoat) with both hands held inside the wide sleeves on his chest. He wears a dark silk hat that shows his high societal position.

The Gamsinchong murals show a mixture of elements from before and after the fifth century; the wide-sleeves also reflect the characteristics of tomb murals that are found near the Pyeongyang area. The ancient durumagi was also worn with a waist belt and had wide sleeves.

=== Goryeo ===
During the Goryeo period, Mongolian influences caused the durumagi to change in appearance. Not only was the waist belt changed into a goreum, the traditional po's short length and wide sleeves were lengthened and narrowed to the style of the Mongolian coat, xurumakci, of which the name durumagi is said to be derived.

=== Joseon period ===
During the Joseon dynasty, the durumagi was less worn as an overcoat but more of a housecoat for the noble class, whereas it was worn outdoors by the commoners. In 1884, King Gojong promulgated the unification of clothing for all social classes through reform laws. However, this law was met with much resistance and it was only until ten years later, after the Gabo Reform of 1894, that the durumagi became common as formal attire.

== Construction and design ==
The durumagi is an overcoat, which is closed all around, lacking side and back vents. It has a straight collar with front overlapping front panels closing to the right, side gores, chest ties, neckband and narrow sleeves; its length is about under the calves and above the ankles.

Different fabrics and materials are used in making durumagi: calico, wool, cotton, and various silks for winter; ramie, fine ramie and silk gauze for summer; various silks and calico for spring and autumn. White, grey and navy blue are commonly used.

== Types of durumagi ==
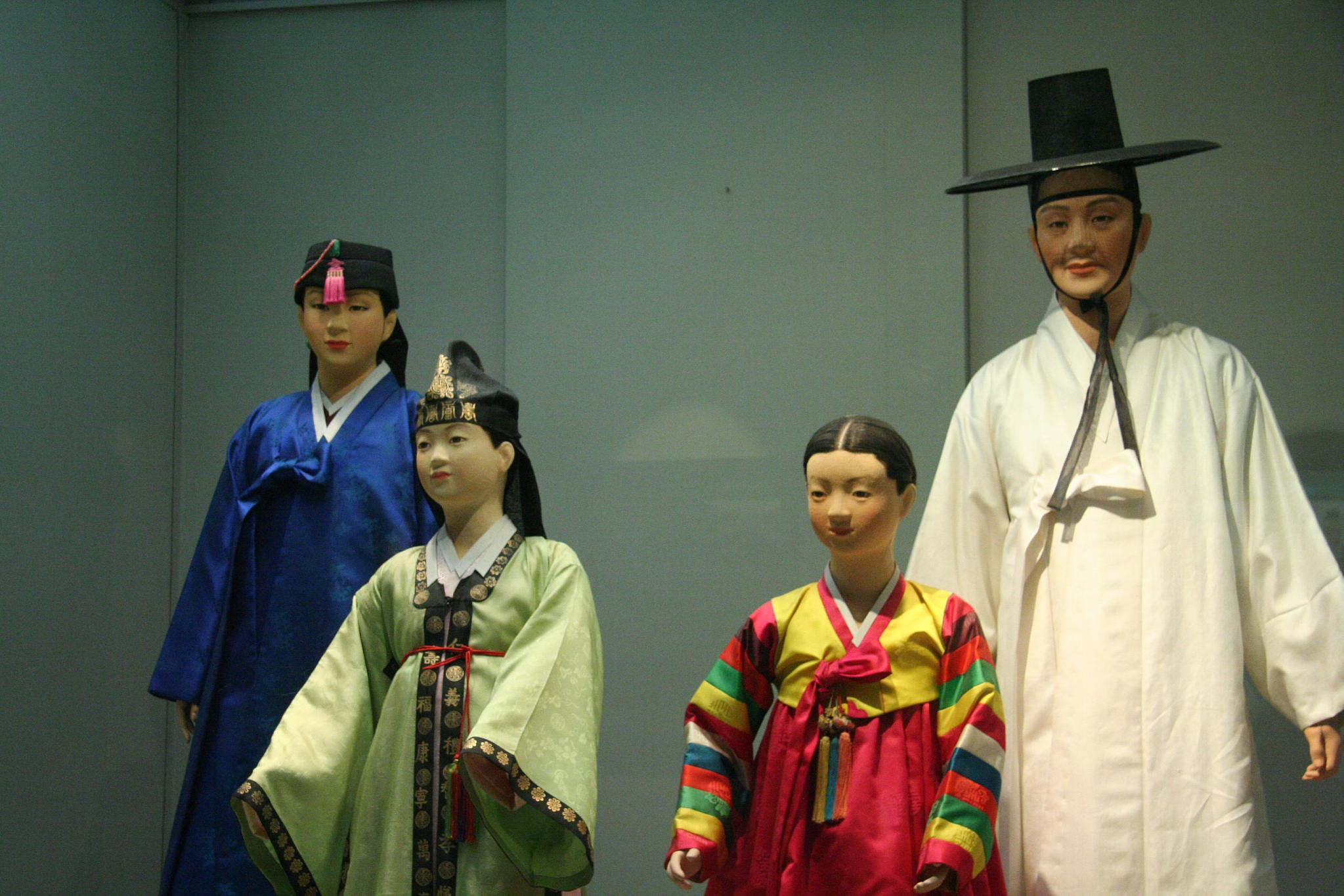
Blue durumagi worn by female model, white durumagi worn by male model

There are various types which include the hotedan durumagi (홑단 두루마기; lit. 'single-layer durumagi'), gyup durumagi (겹 두루마기; lit. 'double-layer durumagi'), som durumagi (솜 두루마기; lit. 'cotton durumagi'), kkachi durumagi (까치 두루마기; lit. 'magpie durumagi'), and obangjang durumagi (오방장 두루마기; lit. 'five-colour durumagi') for children.

== Modern use ==
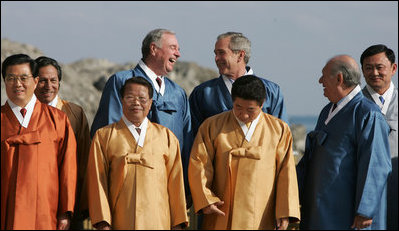
2005 APEC World leaders in colourful durumagi

The durumagi is still considered an important part of traditional attire for formal occasions, but a variety of colours and designs are being used. Colourful durumagi were given as gifts to the world leaders of the 2005 APEC Summit in Busan.

== See also ==
- Dopo
- Gonryongpo
- Hanbok
- Jeonbok
- Kkachi durumagi
- Po
- Sagyusam
