= Gulle =

Korean traditional girls' hat

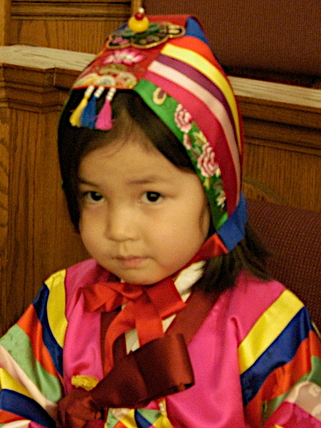
- Gulle worn by a young girl.

Korean name
- Hangul: 굴레
- RR: gulle
- MR: kulle

A gulle (Korean: 굴레) is a type of sseugae (쓰개), Korean traditional headgear, worn by children aged one year (called dol) to five years old during the late Joseon period. It was mostly worn by young girls in the upper class for warmth and style. Gullae was usually made with silk and in summer, it was made with sa (사, 紗), a type of silk loosely woven.

== See also ==
- Ayam
- Jokduri
- Hanbok
- Hwagwan
