= Jeonbok =

Sleeveless long vest in hanbok

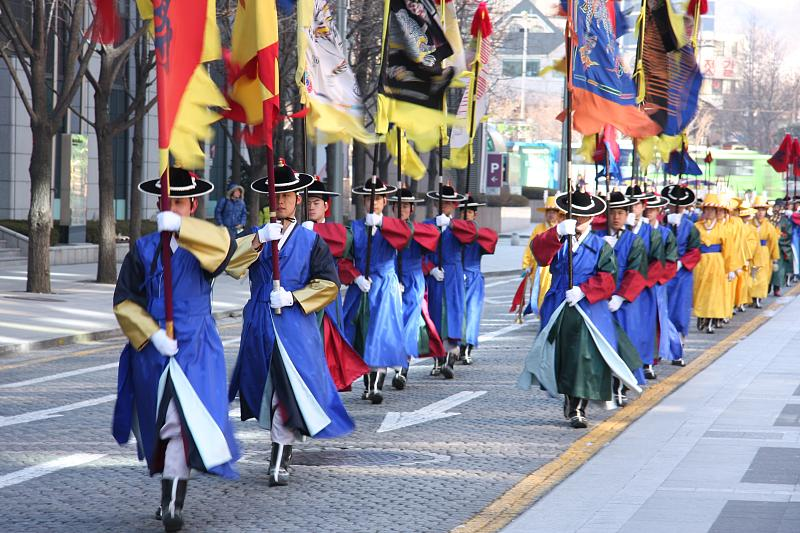

Korean name
- Hangul: 전복
- Hanja: 戰服
- RR: jeonbok
- MR: chŏnbok

The jeonbok is a type of sleeveless long vest in hanbok, traditional Korean clothing, which was worn by military personnel.

The unlined jeonbok, which was influenced by a Chinese coat, was worn as the uniform of the military personnel until the end of the Joseon dynasty when King Gojong proclaimed the 1883 "Attire Regulation Reform". It became everyday clothing for the military and civil officers after 1883.

== Design ==
The back of the jeonbok is open from the high waist to the ankle-length hem and has open slits at both sides at the bottom for ease of movement.

It does not have overlapped columns on the front side and was worn over dongdari (동다리).

== Gallery ==
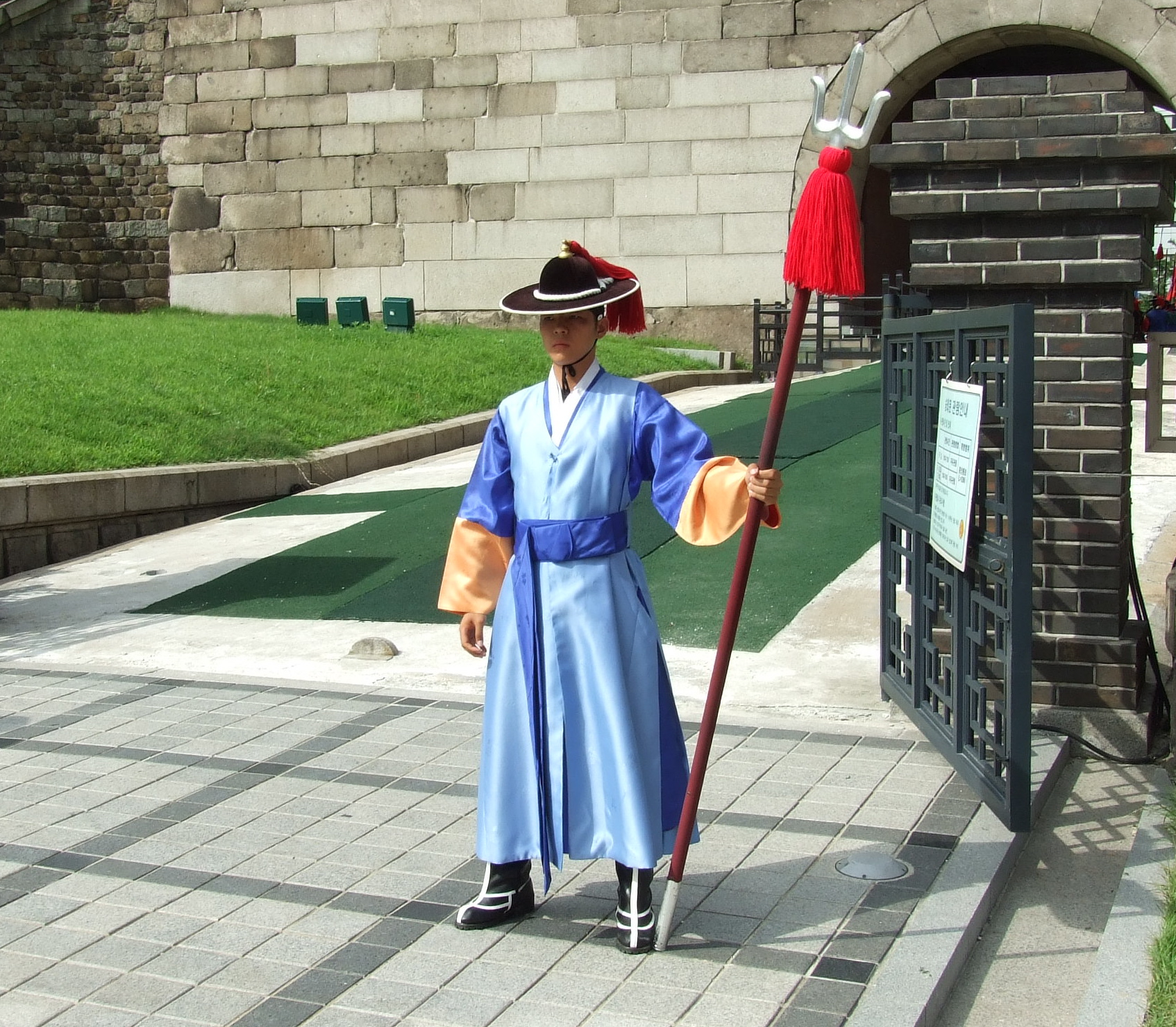

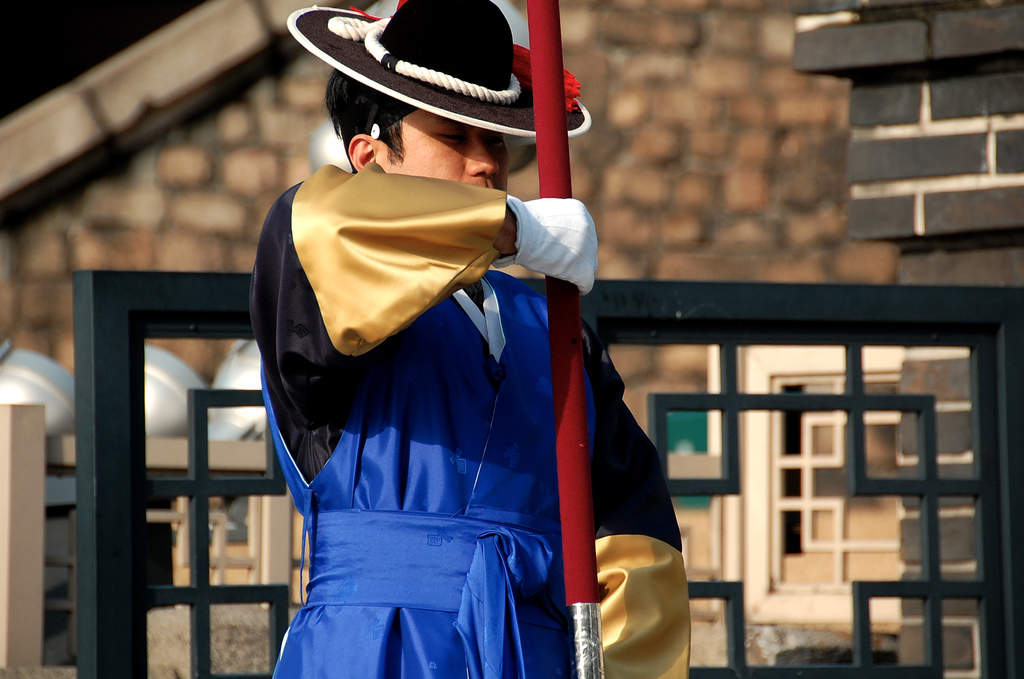

== See also ==
- Jeogori
- Po
- Hanbok
