= Beoseon =

Korean traditional style of socks

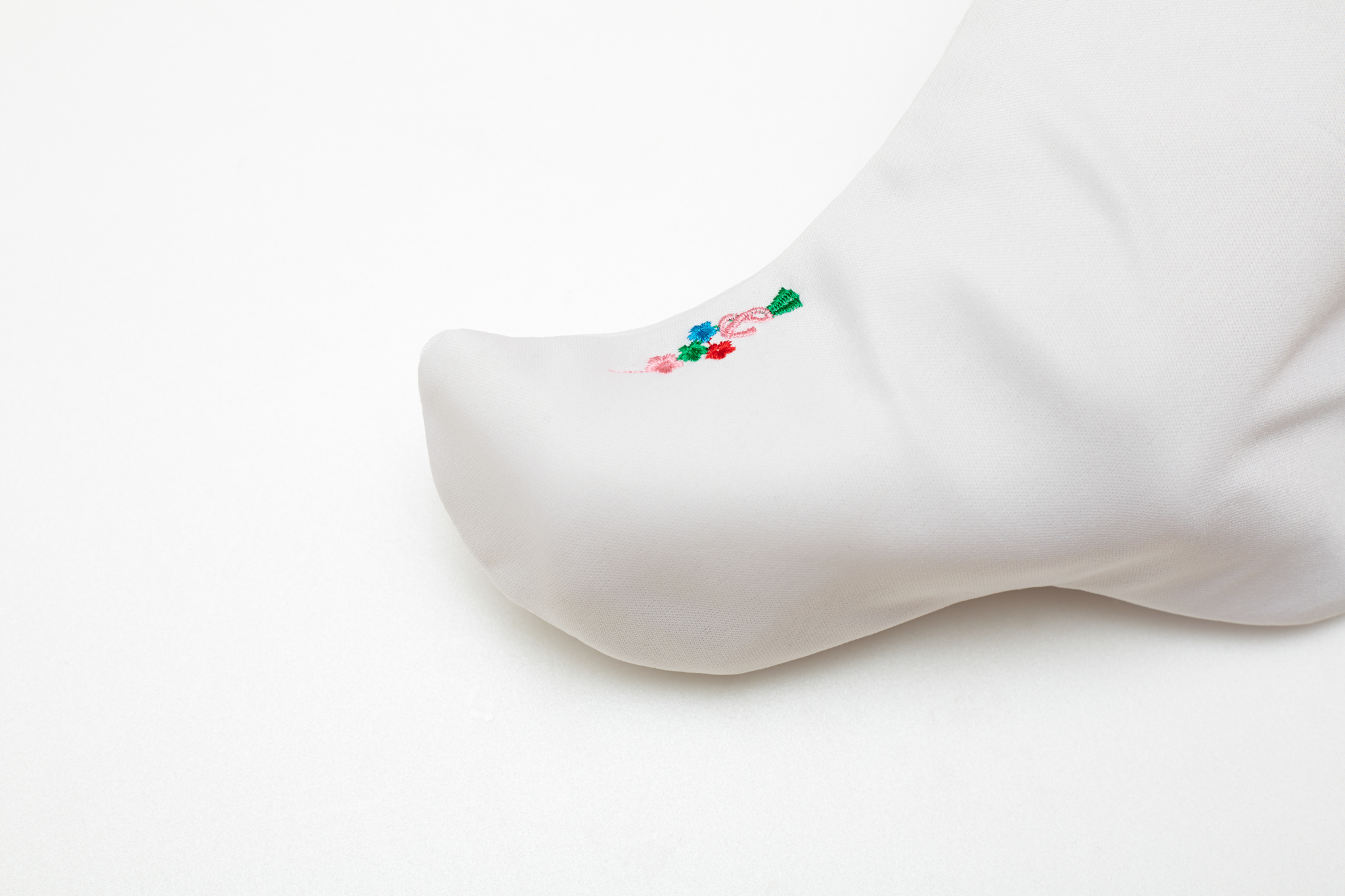

Korean name
- Hangul: 버선
- RR: beoseon
- MR: pŏsŏn

The beoseon (Korean: 버선; Korean pronunciation: [pʌ.sʌn]) is a type of footwear consisting of a pair of socks worn with hanbok, Korean traditional clothing, and designed for protection, warmth, and style. It is also called jogui (Korean: 족의; Hanja: 足衣), jokgeon (족건; 足件) or mal (말; 襪) in hanja. According to a book titled Hunmong jahoe (훈몽자회, 訓蒙字會) written by Choe Sejin (최세진, 崔世珍) in 1527 during the reign of King Jungjong of the Joseon Dynasty, beoseon was previously called "bosyeonmal" (보션말).

It is not clear when beoseon was first worn, but ancient beoseon is assumed to have originated as a form of trousers or bojagi (wrapping cloths) for protecting the feet. During the period of the Three Kingdoms of Korea, silk beoseon was worn only by members of the upper classes. In the Joseon period, beoseon made from white fabric was worn more commonly regardless of class.

== Types ==
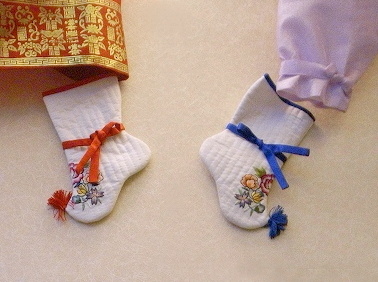
Tarae-beoseon, a variety of beoseon for children

The types of beoseon vary by purpose, shape, and sewing technique. Goteun beoseon (곧은버선), also called godeulmok beoseon (고들목버선) and nuin beoseon (누인버선), are defined by their shape.

With regard to sewing technique, beoseon can be divided into som beoseon, gyeop beoseon, hot beoseon, nubi beoseon, and tarae beoseon. Som beoseon (솜버선) is made from fabric stuffed with cotton (som in Korean) as a batting for warmth and style. Gyeop beoseon (겹버선) is made from two layers (gyeop) of fabric without stuffing. Hot beoseon (홑버선) is made with one layer (hot) and worn as an inner sock to prevent the outer beoseon from getting dirty. Nubi beoseon (누비버선) is made by quilting (nubi) and usually worn for protection against the cold during winter. This type of beoseon is considered practical because it is easy to handle after cleaning even though the running stitches can come undone and it is stiffer than other types of beoseon. Tarae beoseon (타래버선) refers to decorative socks for children. After being quilted, tarae beosoen is embroidered with thread of various colors, and a ribbon is attached around the ankles to bind them at the front.

Although the shape of beoseon does not typically reflect gender, the seams in beoseon for men are straighter than the seams in beoseon for women.

== See also ==
- Hanbok
- Tabi
- Sock
- Hosiery
- Dress socks
- Anklet (sock)
