= Fujin (headgear) =

Chinese headwear in the form of a hood typically black in colour

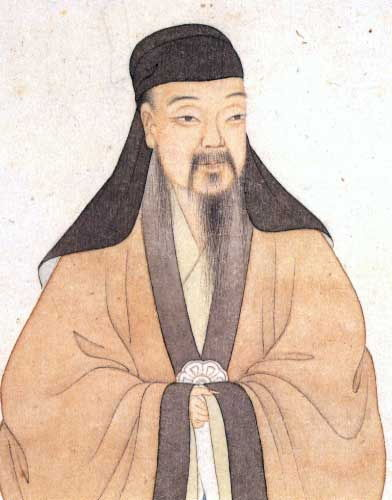
- Painting of Tang Xianzu with Fujin

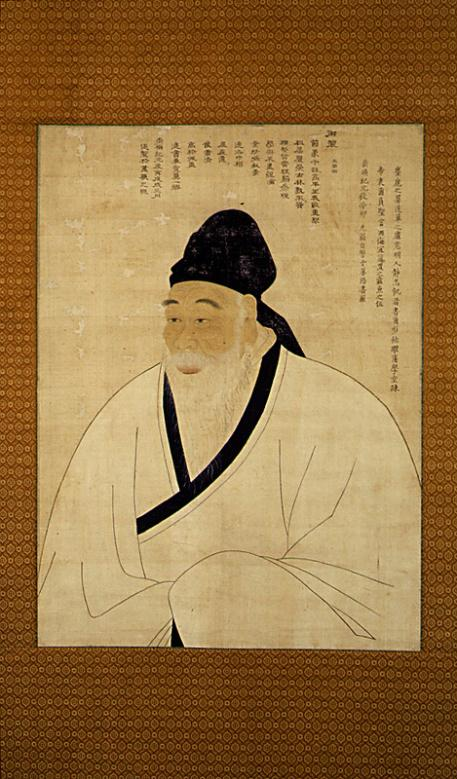
- Portrait of Song, Si-Yeol, wearing bokgeon, mid-Joseon

Chinese name
- Chinese: 幅巾
- Literal meaning: Width of cloth
Transcriptions
Standard Mandarin
- Hanyu Pinyin: Fújīn

Korean name
- Hangul: 복건
- Hanja: 幅巾
- Literal meaning: Full-width hood
Transcriptions
- Revised Romanization: Bokgeon

Fujin (Chinese: 幅巾; lit. 'Width of cloth') is a type of guanmao (冠帽), a male traditional headgear generally made from a black fabric in China and Korea. The fujin is a form of hood made on one width of cloth, from which its Chinese name derived from. It was usually worn with Shenyi in the Ming Dynasty. The fujin was later adopted in Joseon where it became known as bokgeon (Korean: 복건; Hanja: 幅巾) and became known as the 'hat of the Confucian scholars'. The fujin also influenced the development of other headwear such as the futou.

== China ==
In China, the fujin was a popular form of headwear among all the different members of the social strata. It was especially popular amongst the Eastern Han dynasty scholar-bureaucrats. The fujin also later influenced the development of the futou.

== Korea ==
According to the Random Expatiations of Oju written by Yi Gyu-gyeong in the 18th century, "In the Chinese Han dynasty, many kings and the nobility admired the attire of scholars and considered wearing the bokgeon an elegant way of dressing. Consequently, the bokgeon which used to be worn by people of humble origins, became part of scholarly attire by the end of the dynasty".

Though the bokgeon was initially worn only during important events, it was worn by most men of high-standing by the Joseon period. It was also worn by Joseon noblemen, scholar officials, and students of Confucianism together with simui and hakchangui up until the late Joseon period. The bokgeon along with simui was also worn during the coming-of-age ceremonies. From the late Joseon, the bokgeon became a common form of headwear for young boys. It continues to be worn in present-day Korea where baby boys wear bokgeon on their first birthday or on traditional holidays.

== Construction and design ==
The fujin is made of one-width of cloth.

In Korea, the rear part of the bokgeon is curved and there are 2 pleats above each ears. Inside the lower pleats, there are 2 straps which are sewn; these two straps are tied at the back. The bokgeon is made of black silk or gauze. It was mainly black in colour, although dark blue bokgeon also existed. Members of the scholar-official class decorated their fujin with gold leaf.

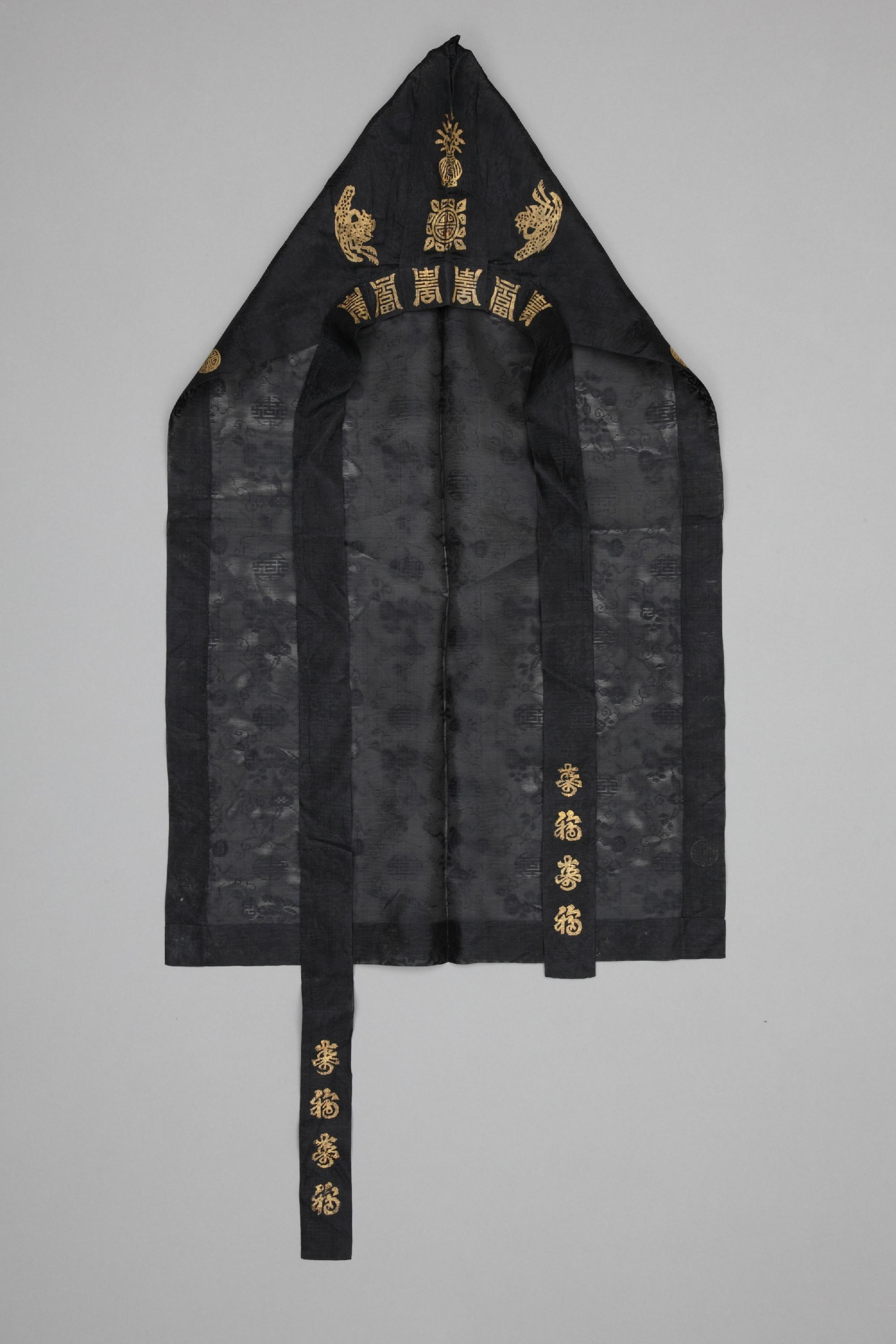
Korean Bokgeon decorated with gold leaf

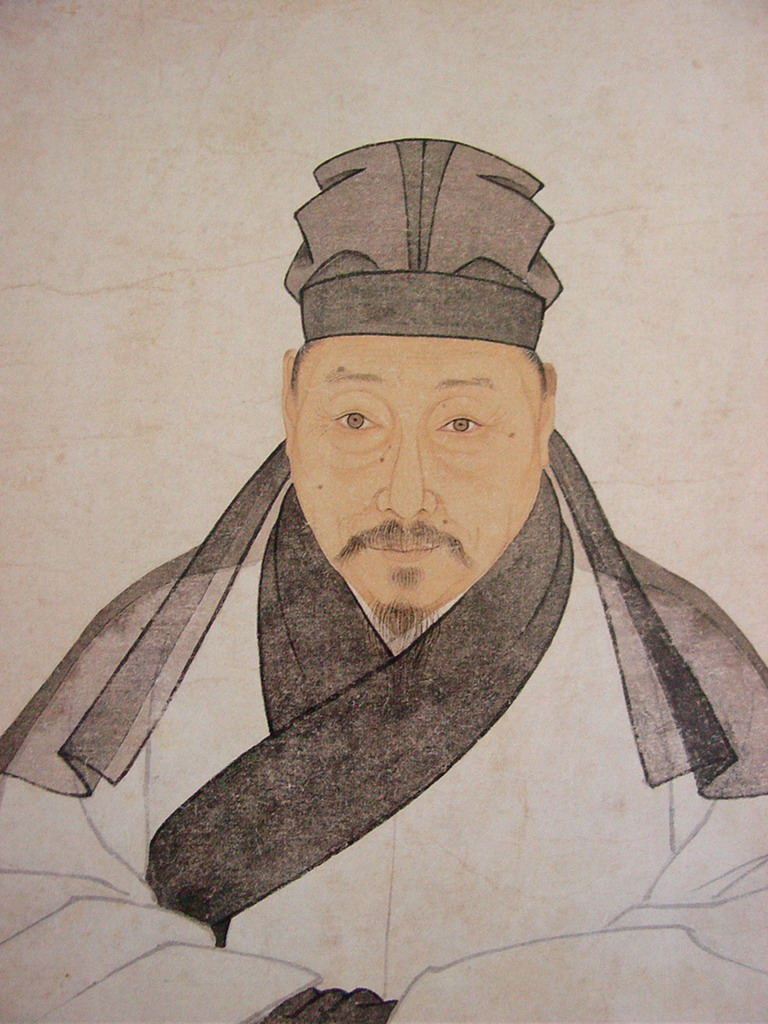
Portrait of a Ming dynasty man wearing fujin.

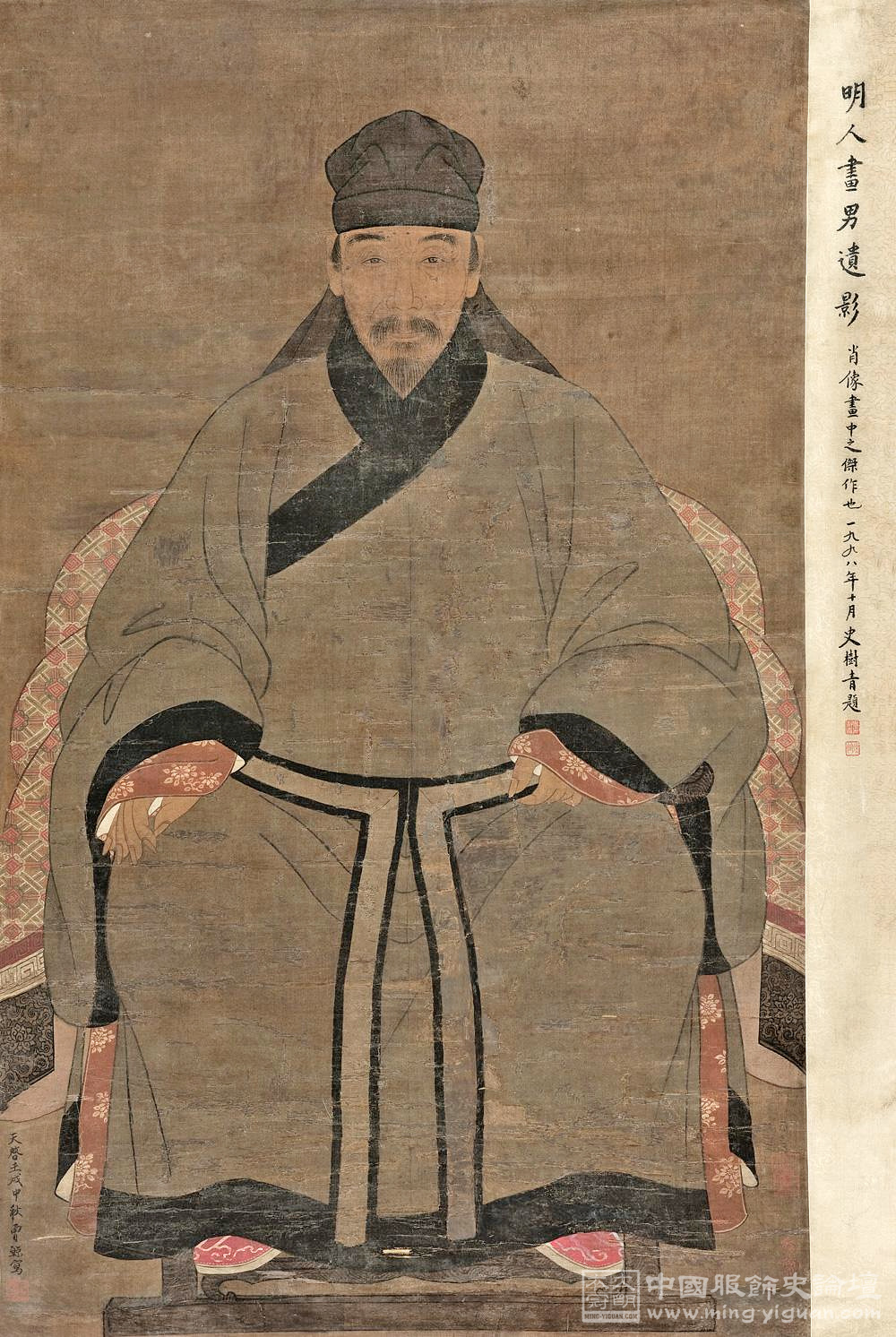
Ming dynasty man in full shenyi called daopao wearing a fujin.

== See also ==
- Futou
- Hanfu
- Hanbok
- List of Hanfu headwear
- Shenyi
