= Baji =

Baji may refer to:

- Baji (clothing), traditional Korean pant
- Baji (food), beaten rice eaten in Nepal
- Baji (2015 film), an Indian Marathi-language superhero film by Nikhil Mahajan, starring Shreyas Talpade
- Baji (1963 film), a Pakistani musical romance film
- Baaji (TV series), an Indian Marathi-language historical television series
- Baji Boxing, or Bājíquán, a Chinese martial art
- Balázs Baji (born 1989), Hungarian track and field athlete
- Munni Baji (born 1941), Pakistani artist
- Baji, Georgia, a village in Georgia

== See also ==
- Bhajji (disambiguation)
  - Bhajji, a spicy Indian snack
- Bhaji (disambiguation)
- Baji Rao (disambiguation)
  - Bajirao I (r. 1720–1740), prime minister of the Maratha Empire
- Baji Prabhu Deshpande, 17th-century Indian warrior of the Maratha Empire
- Bahji, Bahá'í holy place
