= Haji Oh =

Zainichi Korean artist (born 1976)

Haji Oh (呉夏枝 (お・はぢ), Oh Haji, b. 1976, Osaka) is a third-generation Zainichi Korean contemporary artist. Her Japanese name is Okamura Natsue.

Trained primarily as a textile artist, Oh employs a wide variety of weaving, dyeing, stitching, and braiding techniques in her artwork, as well as incorporating photography, audio, and text components. Drawing from her personal transnational experience as an ethnic Korean born and raised in Japan, Oh uses her art to aid in the expression of Zainichi identities within the social and historical context of a larger, interconnected community. Her conceptual artworks and art installations explore the hybridity of Japanese and Korean cultural and political identities, attempting to shed light on the repressed memories and untold histories of diasporic Korean women. She often problematizes the notions of homogeneity that are used to determine fixed ethnic identities, instead emphasizing heterogeneity, hybridity, and fluidity through the acts of dyeing, layering, stitching, and amalgamating fabrics and textiles from Korea and Japan. She has engaged with Korean and Japanese clothing in many of her works, and often incorporates her late grandmother's clothing into her art practice as a way to explore the "unknowable" memories and silent experiences of her own ancestors' migration from the Jeju Islands as well as the transnational journeys of others with "double" identities in Japan.

Oh has participated in a variety of group and solo exhibitions within Japan and abroad, such as "Inner Voices" at the 21st Century Museum of Contemporary Art, Kanazawa (2011); VoCA - Vision of Contemporary Art at New York University (2012); "Gestures in Clothing" at the Aomori Contemporary Art Centre (2013); and the Busan Biennale, Korea (2014). From 2008-2009, she was a visiting scholar at the York Centre for Asian Research at York University in Toronto, Canada. She has been based in Australia since 2014.

== Early life and "double" identity ==
Haji Oh is a third-generation Zainichi Korean artist, born and raised in Osaka, Japan. Like many Zainichi Koreans of her generation, Oh grew up with two names—her Korean name is Oh Haji and her Japanese name is Okamura Natsue. After years of only using her Japanese name in public, Oh began to also use her Korean name when she started exhibiting artworks during her undergraduate studies, grounding her stance as an artist with a "double" identity. It was a decision that the artist claims has inevitable political implications in a Japanese-dominated society.

"I have two names, Oh Haji and Okamura Natsue. In Japan, I am often asked which name I use. My Japanese family name, Okamura, was forced on us by history, and my Korean family name, Oh, is in our family tree. But both names are mine, so I use them both. I began to use them in public, with pride, eight years ago. I am both of these names."

Throughout her childhood, Oh studied in Japanese public schools where she was never presented any opportunities to learn the Korean language or the complicated history between Korea and Japan—an education system that the artist says has created a social space that discourages both ethnic groups to speak about the topic. However, the artist grew up with an awareness both of her position as a Zainichi member of Japanese society as well as the social discrimination that comes with being associated with Zainichi communities. During high school, when she revealed her Korean roots to her Japanese friends she was relieved that they did not react poorly to her real identity, but soon realized that their affirmation "was not based on recognition of [their] differences, but was more a result of [their] mutual ignorance of [their] historical relationship." She continued to learn about her transnational ancestry from her family, discovering that her identity as a Zainichi Korean could only ever be considered as an "Other" in Japan's social structure, a dilemma that she felt compelled to address through her artistic practice.

== Education ==
Oh trained as a textile artist at Kyoto City University of Arts (京都市立芸術大学, Kyōto shiritsu geijutsu daigaku), majoring in Dyeing and Weaving for her BA in Fine Arts (2000) and her MA in Fine Arts (2002). She received her doctorate in Fine Art from the Kyoto City University of Arts in 2012.

While she was a student in Kyoto, Oh explored various methods of textile arts that could give expression to the "double-ness" of her Zainichi identity, including approaches such as dyeing, weaving, layering, and stitching together used garments and fabrics associated respectively with Korean and Japanese culture and history. She began to draw on motifs from "hybrid" Japanese and Korean ethnic dress to create her own original garments, which she considered to be material manifestations of her identity as an ethnic Korean born in Japan.

== 'Costume as a Second Skin' series ==
Oh began her "Costume as a Second Skin' series while attaining her undergraduate degree at Kyoto City University of Arts. In these earlier works, the artist explored various facets of Korean and Japanese traditional garments as a way to visualize her transnational identity and excavate her Zainichi Korean roots through the art of textile making. Oh approached clothing as inseparable from daily life, and ethnic costume in particular as a strong way to express one's ethnic, cultural, religious, and gender identity. In her own words, "ethnic costumes have two features—one as a private “second skin” and the other as a “symbol” of social belonging." The artist insists that her works are not an exploration of fashion, but are rather about culture and ethnicity expressed through clothing. Through labor-intensive processes, Oh's artworks reflect the accumulation of time that begins with a single yarn that offers the possibility of connecting people to their roots, and over time can forge new, inclusive narratives out of once-rigid national signs.

=== Wedding Dress for Minority Race (2000) ===
For Wedding Dress for Minority Race, Oh deconstructed a used Japanese kimono and reconstructed it into a Korean hanbok dress that would typically be worn for a wedding ceremony. Oh also used fabric from a nagajuban, the slip worn beneath a kimono, to fashion a red undergarment that viewers could glimpse beneath the finished hanbok. By joining traditional garments from Japan and Korea into one single dress, Oh created a symbol of cross-national hybridity that highlighted the existence of an ethnic minority. The hybrid wedding dress introduced multiple ways of interpretation—it may look like a kimono to Koreans, but in the eyes of Japanese viewers it may look like a hanbok.

Oh created this piece during the final year of her undergraduate degree. Oh has written that creating Wedding Dress for Minority Race offered the artist her first chance to think deeply about the meaning of Zainichi Koreans' position in Japanese society. She was specifically trying to create an ethnic costume representing the identity of a Zainichi woman living in Japan, and created the wedding dress to explore the meaning of belonging to a minority race.

=== Roots (2000) ===
Oh created Roots as an artistic reflection on her decision to begin using both her Korean and Japanese name in public at the end of her undergraduate degree. She sewed a white garment inspired by the motif of a chima jeogori, a traditional Korean outfit for woman that pairs a skirt (chima) and short jacket (jeogori), and meticulously silkscreened and embroidered her paternal family tree onto the surface of the finished dress as a way to visualize the transnational ancestry of her Zainichi Korean roots. Next to the finished dress, Oh hung a necklace from the ceiling with a pendant that had a photograph belonging to the artist inside.

Through the painstaking process of producing the garment and embroidering her family tree onto the dress, Oh was able to consider the political and social impacts of using her Korean name, creating layers of memories, time, and thought while giving material expression to her "in-between" position in Japanese society.

=== Sange (2005) ===
Oh created her installation artwork Sange (sometimes referred to as Scattered Flowers) to explore the socio-political implications of wearing a chima jeogori for Zainichi Korean women in Japan. Although chima jeogori were often worn by Koreans residing in Japan for different ceremonies such as weddings, commencements, and coming-of-age-ceremonies, the outfit would inevitably reveal the wearers' identity as Zainichi, inviting negative social and sexual associations about Korean women within Japanese society. The artist considers the chima jeogori "not as a dress to be worn on a special day or even daily wear, but as a representation of the history between Japan and Korea." For Sange, Oh consciously explored the historical and contemporary meanings of the identities associated with particular ethnic clothing by creating a garment similar to a chima jeogori, but with significant differences that prevented it from being fully identified with the traditional garment.

Oh's chima jeogori-like dress was installed beneath a sheer organdy curtain that surrounded the garment. Beneath the skirt and jacket, a long, silk Japanese nagajuban (traditional undergarment for a Japanese kimono) that Oh had dyed a deep red was visible. The dress also had a distinctive collar that appeared to be inspired by Chinese traditional clothing. Oh placed red flower petals made from silk on the ground surrounding the dress, and on each petal the artist had meticulously stitched the lyrics from an old Korean song in katakana (Japanese alphabet primarily used for the pronunciation of foreign words). Next to the dress was a television monitor displaying a close-up video of hands working continuously on a loom. By combining multiple characteristics that drew from the traditional clothing of different nations, Oh envisions the ethnic costume of a community that exists beyond the borders of the nation, imagining traditions for those that encapsulate plural societies and a multiplicity of cultural backgrounds.

== Explorations into family history and Jeju Island ==
In June 2001, Oh's grandmother died only two weeks before the artist's first solo exhibition, an event that deeply impacted the trajectory of Oh's artistic practice. Shortly after her grandmother's passing, Oh left Japan for Seoul to study Korean and traditional Korean textiles and stitching techniques from 2002-2004.

The death of her grandmother and the experience of living in South Korea for the first time prompted Oh to further explore her own family history and incorporate more themes of history and memory in her artwork. Oh and her late grandmother had been unable to communicate with each other well, due to her inability to speak Korean and her grandmother's inability to speak Japanese. As a way to recollect the gaps and silences in their communication, Oh conducted field research in Jeju Island, her grandmother's ancestral home. These experiences became the focus of a series of photographic and textile works that addressed Oh's sense of loss, cross-generational memory, and transnational migration. This series addressed the intersection of Oh's experiences as a third-generation Zainichi Korean who had spent her whole life in Japan, and the "unknowable" memories of her grandmother's life before and after her move to Japan.

Oh's mixed media installations Three Generations, Three Generations of Time, and Three Flowers were included in an exhibition titled "Orientity" at the Kyoto Arts Center that Oh co-curated in 2004. The exhibit provided a platform for emerging artists of the Korean diaspora from Japan, the US, and Europe to publicly debut artworks that “problematiz[ed] the closed and oppressive structure of the nation-state.”

=== Three Generations (2004) ===
For Three Generations, Oh presented a row of five simple wooden frames. The frames on the end of the row were left empty and the three central frames contained photographic self portraits of Oh donning three different hanbok or chima jeogori. In the background of each portrait, a road vanished into the distance behind the artist in an homage to Jeju Island, the ancestral home her grandmother left behind when she migrated to Japan. The three portraits embodied three generations of women in the artists' family: Oh wearing her grandmother's chima jeogori made of white, synthetic fabric popular among older generations; Oh wearing a bright red hanbok she made by hand; and Oh wearing her mother's hanbok. By bringing the three garments together through self portraiture, Oh forged a connection between the women of three different generations and life experiences and imagined what her grandmother's prewar journey from Jeju to Japan may have been like. By leaving the two outer frames empty, Oh drew more attention to the repeated motif of her own image, leaving the past and future of her ancestral line ambiguous and open-ended.

=== Three Generations of Time (2004) ===
Oh used a photo silkscreen technique to create Three Generations of Time (sometimes referred to as Three Times), printing images of herself wearing the three garments from Three Generations (2004), on a sambe, a long strip of linen cloth traditionally used to honor the dead at funerals. Oh’s grandmother had prepared this sambe for use at her funeral. The images of Oh in the long strip of photos depict her walking down the same Jeju road pictured in Three Generations (2004), sometimes with her back turned and sometimes approaching the camera. By imprinting her own image onto the ceremonial cloth, Oh again attempted to connect to the disparate times that the three generations of women in her family lived through, in an act that the artist has referred to as “the process of remembering (or actively not forgetting) the history of Korean residents in Japan and passing on that history.”

=== Three Flowers (2004) ===
Oh carefully unraveled her grandmother's chima jeogori and reconstructed it into a new garment entitled Three Flowers. The title of the piece refers to the embroidered floral pattern the artist added throughout the original fabric of her grandmother's chima jeogori, then painted with brightly-colored red and pink dye on the inside of the sheer garment, and finally connected by embroidering another layer of colored yarn. The red and pink flowers are visually reminiscent of azaleas flowers common in Korea, a connection that the artist may have associated with her own sense of loss and her grandmother's longing to return to her motherland and mother tongue in Korea. Oh refused to allow her grandmother's untold stories, desires, and memories to fade away, instead engaging in this meditative and labor-intensive process as a way of reviving and solidifying her grandmother's presence in her life.

=== Inside of her Skirt / Memory (2006) ===
In 2006, Oh created a large mixed-media installation titled Inside her Skirt (also exhibited as Memory) in which she used a combination of textiles, photographs, and wall-inscriptions to continue engaging with the question of silence and memories across generations of women in her family, with a particular focus on imaginatively recalling the life of her grandmother after her death in 2001.

The centerpiece of the installation was a large, sheer organdy skirt with a long train that spread itself across the floor. Oh spent hours imprinting the entirety of the skirt with a delicate floral pattern similar to the pattern of skirts once worn by her grandmother. On a small table with a glass mirror top, the artist placed a spool of white cord that had long threads suspending up to the ceiling and also sweeping down to the floor in a twisted, unraveling form reminiscent of long, white hair or an umbilical cord. On one wall, Oh also hung three black and white photographs of her grandmother’s jeogori as a way to produce soft, yet striking images that conveyed a sense of her grandmother's bodily presence in the exhibition space.

The artist created Inside her Skirt as a way to offer "redress" for her own youthful obliviousness to her grandmother's linguistic isolation as a Japanese resident who could not speak Japanese well—literally "re-clothing" the memory of her grandmother by undertaking the meticulous process of imprinting the skirt with the floral pattern by hand. Without a way to communicate, Oh had never learned much about her grandmother's life or feelings. Although they had a shared an identity as Zainichi Koreans living in Japan, Oh and her grandmother shared little else until her death, when the artist wondered how she must have felt about her life in Japan and decided to explore the "gaps" and "silences" in their past communication.

== Sources ==
- Oh, Haji (2006). "Unbound: Gender in Asia". Kyoto Journal (64).
- Jennison, Rebecca (2007). "Personal Geographies, Public Spaces: Contemporary Art on "the Borderlines" in Japan." Journal of Kyoto Seika University (33): pp. 194–217.
- Haji OH (September 2011). "What does the Ethnic Costume Represent?" (PDF). Asia Colloquia Papers. 1 (3). York Centre for Asian Research.
- Rebecca Jennison and Laura Hein, Against Forgetting: Three Generations of Artists in Japan in Dialogue about the Legacies of World War II The Asia-Pacific Journal Vol 9, Issue 30 No 1, July 25, 2011.
- Yi, Chŏng-hwa; Jennison, Rebecca; Bary, Brett de (2015). Still hear the wound : toward an Asia, politics, and art to come. Ithaca, New York. ISBN 978-1-939161-61-1. OCLC 908090334.
- Eun-Young Jin; Bo-Seon Shim (2015). "The Politics and Aesthetics of the Wound: Performative Narratives of the People by Zainichi Korean Artists". Korea Journal. 55 (1): 86–111. doi:10.25024/KJ.2015.55.1.86.
- Jennison, Rebecca (2017-03-14). "Reimagining Islands: Notes on Selected Works by Oh Haji, Soni Kum, and Yamashiro Chikako". Asian Diasporic Visual Cultures and the Americas. 3 (1–2). Brill: 155–177. doi:10.1163/23523085-00302008. ISSN 2352-3077.
- Hiroki Yamamoto (2019). "Decolonial Possibilities of Transnationalism in Contemporary Zainichi Korean Art". Situations: Cultural Studies in the Asian Context. 12 (1): 107–128. doi:10.22958/SITUCS.2019.12.1.006.

== See also ==
- Theresa Hak Kyung Cha
- Yamashiro Chikako
- Takahashi Yūji
- Ito Tari
- Shimada Yoshiko
