= Baaji =

Baaji may refer to:

- Baaji (2019 film), a Pakistani romantic drama film
- Baaji (1963 film), a Pakistani musical romance film
- Baaji (TV series), an Indian historical television series
