= White clothing in Korea =

Ancient to modern cultural practice

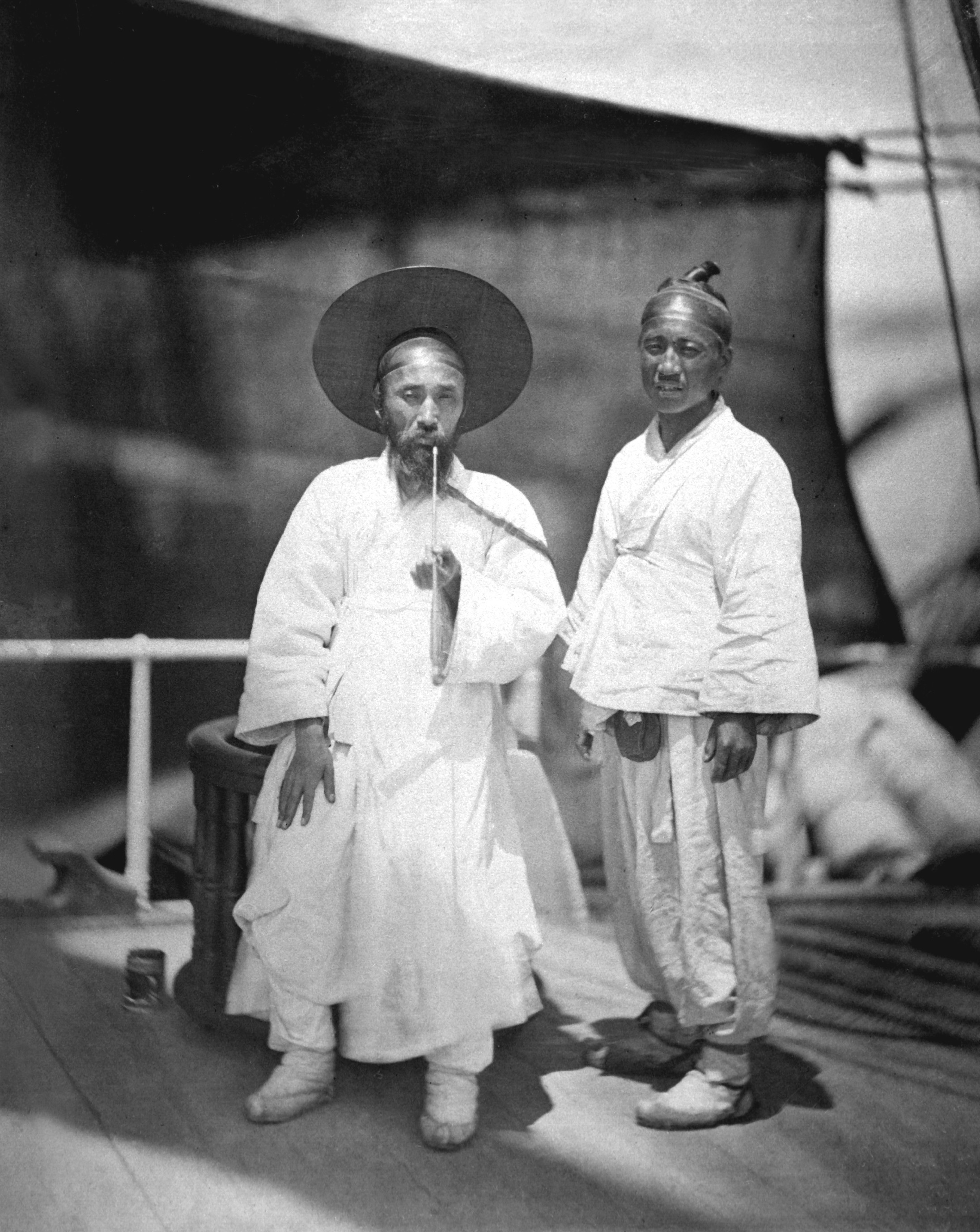
- Korean negotiators in white hanbok during the United States expedition to Korea (1871)

Korean name
- Hangul: 민복
- Hanja: 民服
- RR: minbok
- MR: minbok

Until the 1950s, a significant proportion of Koreans wore white hanbok, sometimes called minbok (Korean: 민복; lit. 'clothing of the people'), on a daily basis. Many Korean people, from infancy through old age and across the social spectrum, dressed in white. They only wore color on special occasions or if their job required a certain uniform. Early evidence of the practice dates from around the 2nd century BCE. It continued until the 1950–1953 Korean War, after which the resulting poverty caused the practice to end.

It is not known when, how, or why the practice came about; it is also uncertain when and how consistently it was practiced. It possibly arose due to the symbolism of the color white, which was associated with cleanliness and heaven. The Japanese colonial view controversially attributed the Korean penchant for white clothing to mourning. The practice was persistently maintained and defended; it survived at least 25 pre-colonial and over 100 Japanese colonial era regulations and prohibitions.

This practice has developed a number of symbolic interpretations. The rigorous defense of the practice and effort needed to maintain it have been seen as symbolic of Korean stubbornness. The Korean nationalist terms paegŭiminjok (백의민족; 白衣民族) and paegŭidongp'o (백의동포; 白衣同胞), both roughly meaning white-clothed people, were coined to promote a distinct Korean identity, primarily as a reaction to Japanese assimilationist policies.

== Description ==
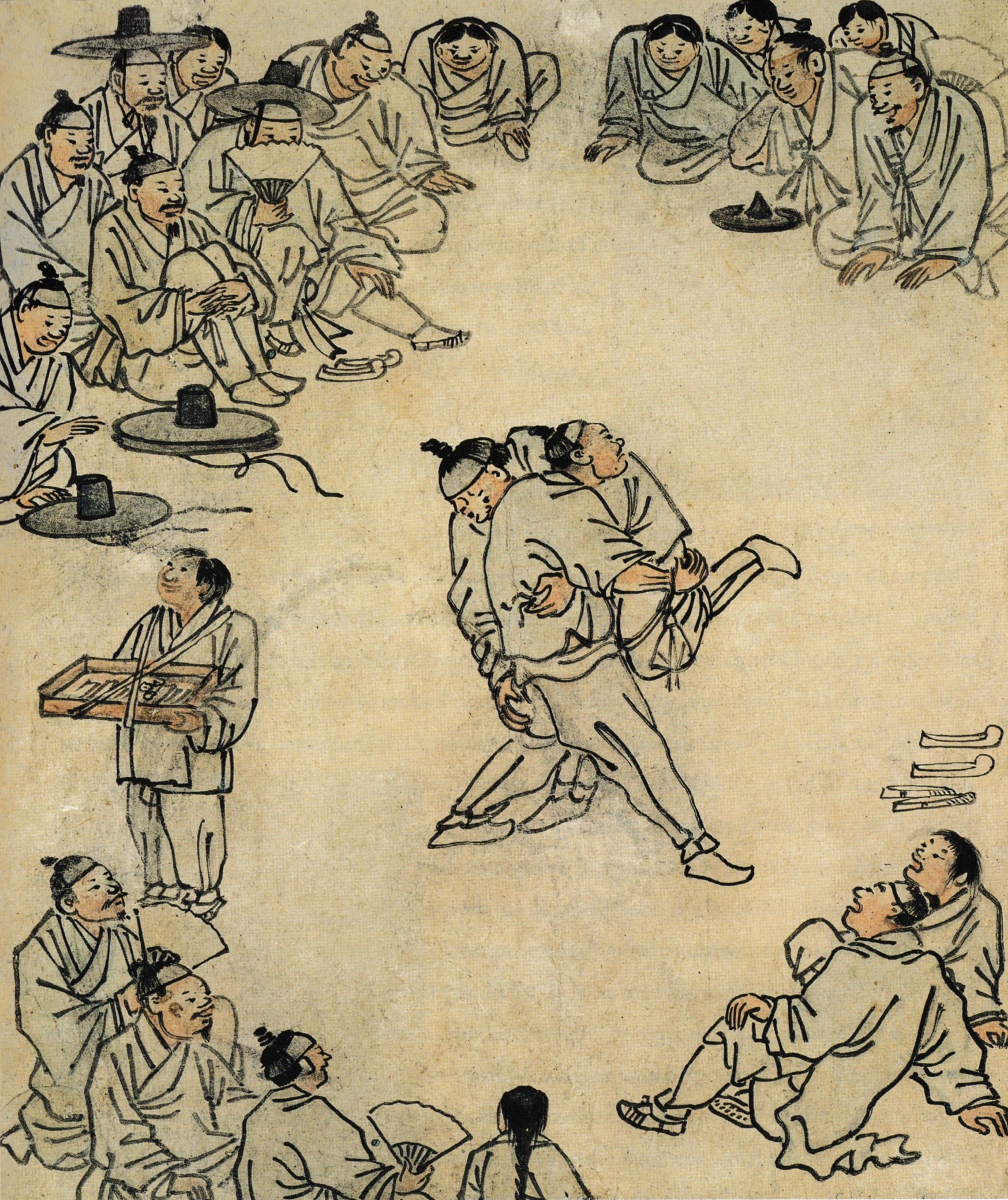
Painting of Korean wrestling (ssireum), where everyone is wearing white, by Gim Hongdo (c. 1780)

The white hanbok is sometimes called minbok, meaning "clothing of the people". Until the mid-20th century, many Koreans wore white clothes regularly. They only wore clothes with color on special occasions, such as hwarot for weddings.

=== Comparison to other cultures ===
While wearing white is not unique to Koreans, the extent of their commitment to the practice has been described as unique. For example, the clothing historian Soh Hwang-Oak wrote that while the Dai people often wear white, they generally layer other colored clothing or accessories on top of their white clothes. By contrast, the minbok was deliberately worn without decoration. The Japanese art critic Yanagi Sōetsu wrote in 1922 of the practice:

While China and especially Japan are using so many different colors in their dresses, there is no such trend in the neighboring country, Joseon. They wear no color but white. Even when they use a color, it's an almost colorless jade. What makes everyone, regardless of gender or age, wear white? There are many countries and nations in the world, but none are like Joseon.

For some period of time in the Chinese Song dynasty (960–1279), the average person was restricted to only wearing white clothing. However, the practice was eventually lifted. There are several records of Chinese observers ridiculing the Korean practice of wearing white.

== History ==
=== Origin ===
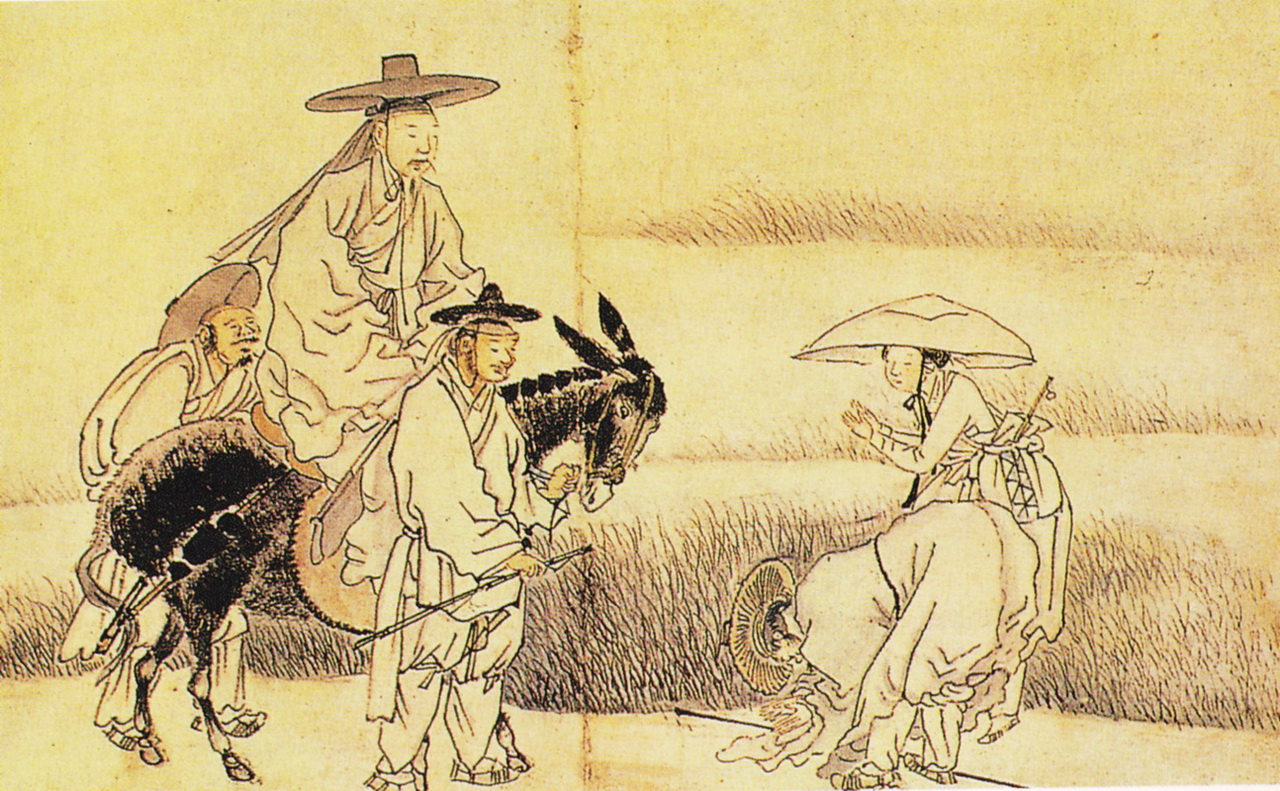
Painting of Korean peasants showing deference to a nobleman on horseback, all dressed in white (1815)

Koreans have worn white clothing since the Three Kingdoms of Korea period. The earliest known mention of the practice is in the Chinese text Records of the Three Kingdoms, and dates to the third century CE. It reported that people of the Korean state Buyeo (2nd century BCE – 494 CE) primarily wore white. The text reads: (Note: 『나라에서는 옷을 입을 때 흰색을 숭상하여, 흰색 포목으로 만든 통 큰 소매의 도포와 바지를 입고 가죽신을 신는다.』)

In Buyeo, white clothing is revered, so they wear wide-sleeved dopo and baji made from white linens, as well as leather shoes.

The practice has also been attested to the Korean states Byeonhan (1st to 4th centuries CE), Goguryeo (37 BCE – 668 CE), Silla (57 BCE – 935 CE), and Goryeo (918–1392).

==== Reason for the practice ====
The reason for the practice is not known with certainty, although it is said by Korean scholars to be a mix of symbolism and tradition. The Korean preference for the color white is found in art, myth, legend, folklore, clothing, food, and more. Choi Nam-Sun said: "The ideal of whiteness was one of the most important factors in Korean art and culture." Some modern scholars see it as a result of psychology, specifically pressure to conform to social norms, with Soh drawing a comparison to how modern South Koreans adopt trends with significant speed and uniformity.

The American physician Horace N. Allen wrote in 1889 that he viewed the practice as having its origins in mourning:

The custom of wearing white so extensively as they do has also been accounted for by tradition. Mourning is a serious business in Korea, for on the death of a father the son must lay aside his gay robes and clothe himself in unbleached cotton of a very coarse texture... For three years he must wear this guise and must do no work... Should a king die, the whole nation would be compelled to don this mourning garb, or rather they would be compelled to dress in white... Once during a period of ten years, three kings died, necessitating a constant change of dress on the part of the people and a great outlay of money... Tradition has it, therefore, that, to be ready for the caprice of their kings in the future, the people adopted white as their national color.

Japanese scholar Toriyama Kiichi said that Koreans began wearing white because they were sad after the Mongols invaded Korea. Yanagi Sōetsu similarly attributed the wearing of white to historical suffering.

Korean scholars have disagreed with them. Park Seong-su of the Encyclopedia of Korean Culture and scholar Park Jong-Hong have written that Japanese colonialists were deliberately attempting to portray Koreans negatively to justify Japanese colonial rule. This portrayal may be related to colonial conceptions of han and a noble savage characterisation of Koreans. Ihn-Bum Lee wrote:

Above all, some people pointed out that Yanagi's opinion was grounded on a misapprehension: Yanagi had mistaken Koreans' favourite casual white clothes—made of thin raw silk or cotton—for mourning garb, and misinterpreted white as a symbol of pathos. Some argued that Yanagi held a narrow view of Korean culture and ignored such characteristic products of Korean culture as 18th-century landscapes, old tomb murals, folk painting, etc.

Yanagi later abandoned his view that white is the color of sorrow in Korea.

=== Uncertainty over time and place of observation ===
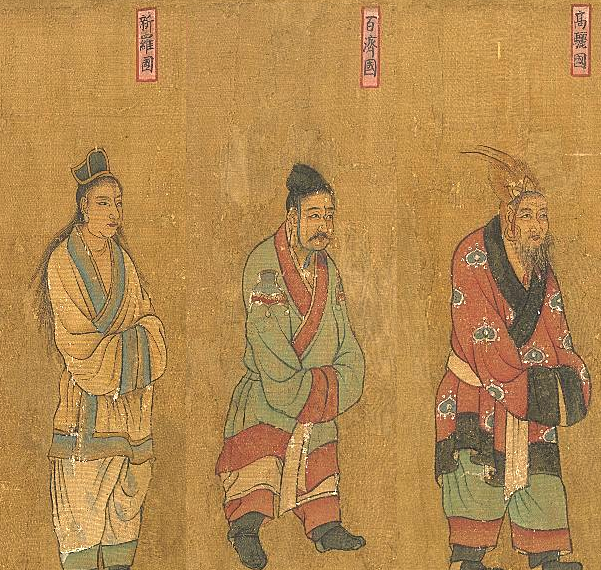
Painting of envoys from the Three Kingdoms of Korea (from left to right, Silla, Baekje, and Goguryeo) to China, wearing clothing of various shades (7th century)

There is some uncertainty over the times and places where the practice was observed. The practice is reportedly not clearly observable in Goguryeo-era tomb murals. Some documentary evidence suggests the practice was not consistently observed during the Joseon period; the scholar Yi Ok wrote in the 19th century that: (Note: 『우리나라는 푸른색을 숭상해 백성이 대부분 푸른 옷을 입는다. 남자는 겹옷과 장삼이 아니면 일찍이 이유없이 흰옷을 입지 않았고, 여자는 치마를 소중히 여기는데 더욱 흰색을 꺼려 붉은색과 남색 외에는 모두 푸른 치마를 둘렀다.』)

[Joseon] reveres the color blue, so the average citizen wears blue. Men do not wear white clothes, unless they are wearing layered clothing or jangsam (Buddhist robes). Women cherish wearing chima and are reluctant to wear white, so the only color they wear other than blue is red or indigo.

Writings from the Joseon ruling class are often disparaging towards the practice. This may have, in part, been motivated by a preference for blue clothing because it aligned better with traditional color associations from China, where east is associated with blue.

=== Pre-colonial era prohibition efforts ===
Before the Japanese colonial period, there were at least 25 white clothes prohibition decrees (백의금지령; 白衣禁止令) across several centuries.

List of prohibition decrees
Period	King	Date of attempt
Goryeo	Chungnyeol	1275
Goryeo	Gongmin	1357
Goryeo	U	1382
Joseon	Taejo	1398
Joseon	Taejong	1400
Joseon	Sejong	1424; 1428
Joseon	Sejo	1456; 1466; 1466
Joseon	Seongjong	1471
Joseon	Yeonsangun	1504
Joseon	Jungjong	1516
Joseon	Seonjo	1605
Joseon	Injo	1648
Joseon	Hyeonjong	1669; 1669; 1670
Joseon	Sukjong	1675; 1692
Joseon	Yeongjo	1725; 1737; 1766
Joseon	Jeongjo	1777; 1792

These efforts may have sometimes been resisted by people dying their clothes in extremely light shades of other colors.

=== Joseon to Korean Empire periods ===
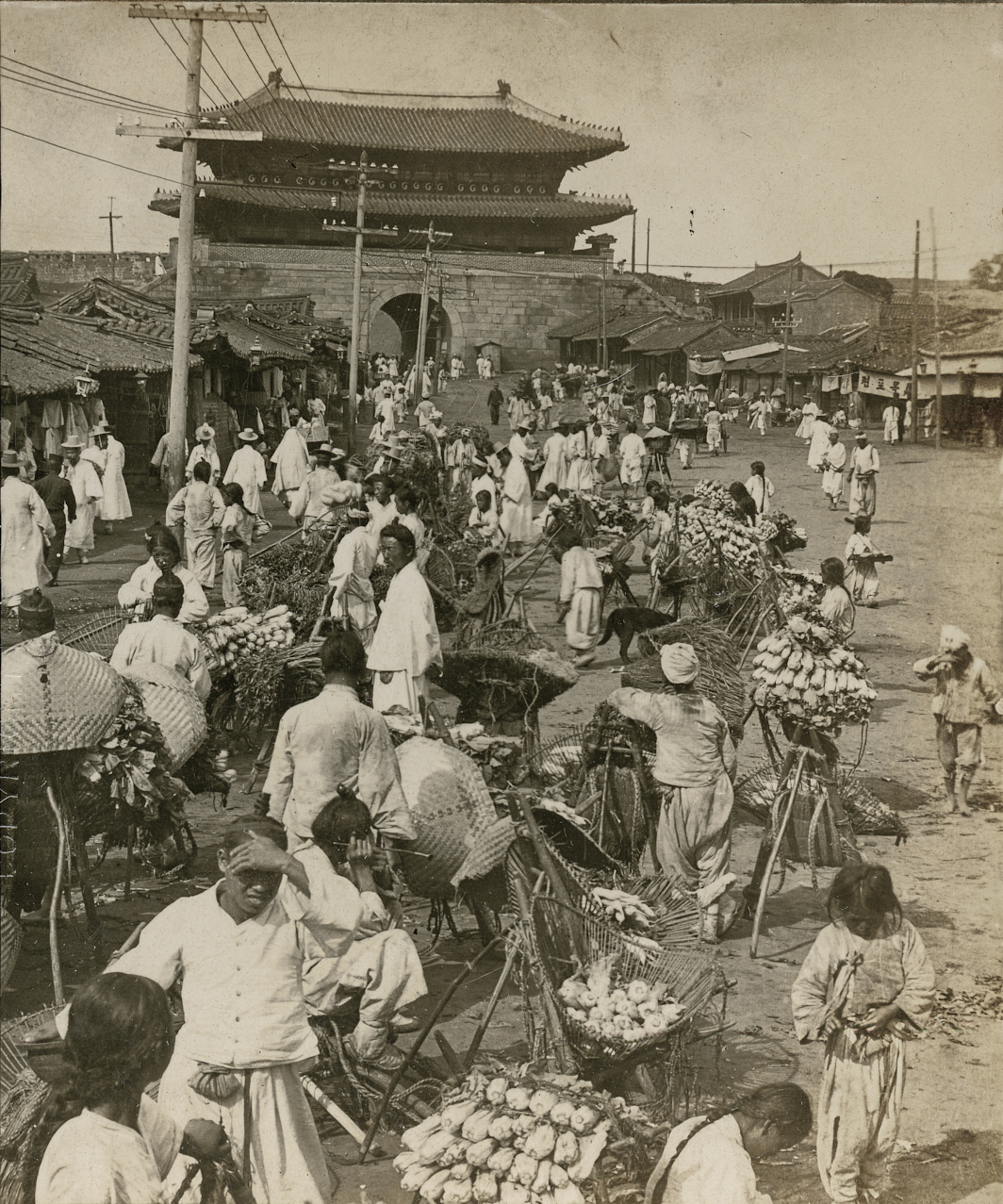
In a predecessor to Namdaemun Market (1904)

For much of the Joseon period (1392–1897), Korea was under a strict policy of isolationism. This finally ended in 1876, when Japan forced Korea to open its borders. Afterwards, Western clothing was introduced to Korea in significant quantities for the first time.

Resentment towards Western clothing developed, not because of its association with the West, but because of its association with Japan. During the late Joseon and Korean Empire (1897–1910) periods, efforts were made to reform the Korean state and society. These were often led by pro-Japanese Koreans. However, in 1895, anti-Japanese sentiment exploded after Japan assassinated the Korean queen. The brutality of the attack sparked domestic and international shock and disgust. Shortly after the assassination, a series of orders (notably the Short Hair Ordinance) were issued, one of which allowed the wearing of Western clothes. These directly inspired violent resistance in the form of a righteous army (impromptu militia). The rebellion finally ended in August 1896, when many of these orders were suspended. The result of this period was the development of wearing minbok or other traditional Korean clothing as a symbol of resisting foreign influence.

By the late Joseon period, upper-class yangban families tended to dress children in color, while adults dressed in white.

In 1906, the Korean government, at the advice of the Japanese Resident-General of Korea issued a ban on white clothing during wintertime, but this order was largely ignored. More and more roles began requiring the use of non-white clothing. Officials were effectively prohibited from wearing white clothing in the Gapsin dress reform of 1884. Beginning in 1910, increasing numbers of grade schools began requiring that students wear black uniforms.

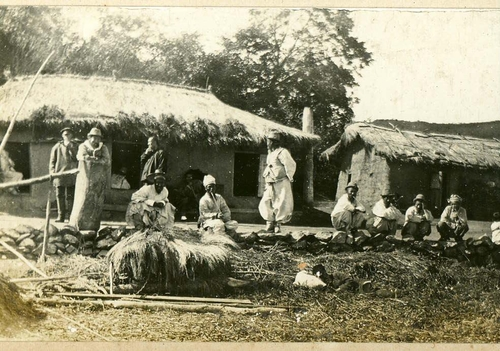
Koryo-saram wearing white in Primorskaya Oblast, Russian Empire (1904)

Also around this time, Korean emigrants moved into Russia. Russians gave them the nickname "lebed", meaning "swan", possibly in reference to their white clothing. These emigrants continued wearing white until the 1910s, when they assimilated more into Russian culture.

=== Japanese colonial period ===
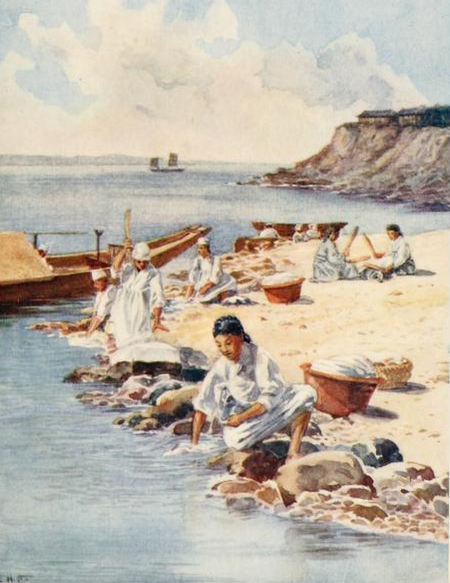
A drawing by American Constance J.D. Coulson of Korean women washing clothes and performing dadeumi to keep clothes clean (1910)

Debates around the practice intensified during the Japanese colonial period. Some Korean intellectuals that opposed the practice saw it as a relic of a bygone era. Others noted that the time required for the clothes' upkeep hurt economic productivity, and that the labor particularly burdened women, who did the household's laundry. Multiple estimates of the economic cost of maintaining the clothes were calculated. These debates uniformly concluded that wearing white clothes was economically inefficient; these figures were later frequently cited by the colonial government to discourage the wearing of the clothes.

Japanese people generally had negative views on the practice. They viewed it, and many other Korean practices, as backwards and fixated on the past.

According to a 1990 tally by scholar Nam Yun-Suk, between 1898 and 1919, there were fifteen policies enacted to either ban or discourage the exclusive wearing of white clothes. Four of these were between 1910 and 1919.

The scholar Hyung Gu Lynn argued that the clothes became a symbol of low social status by the 1920s. Magazines and newspapers displayed pictures of business owners in western-style suits, while factory workers wore white clothing.

==== Colored Clothes Campaign ====
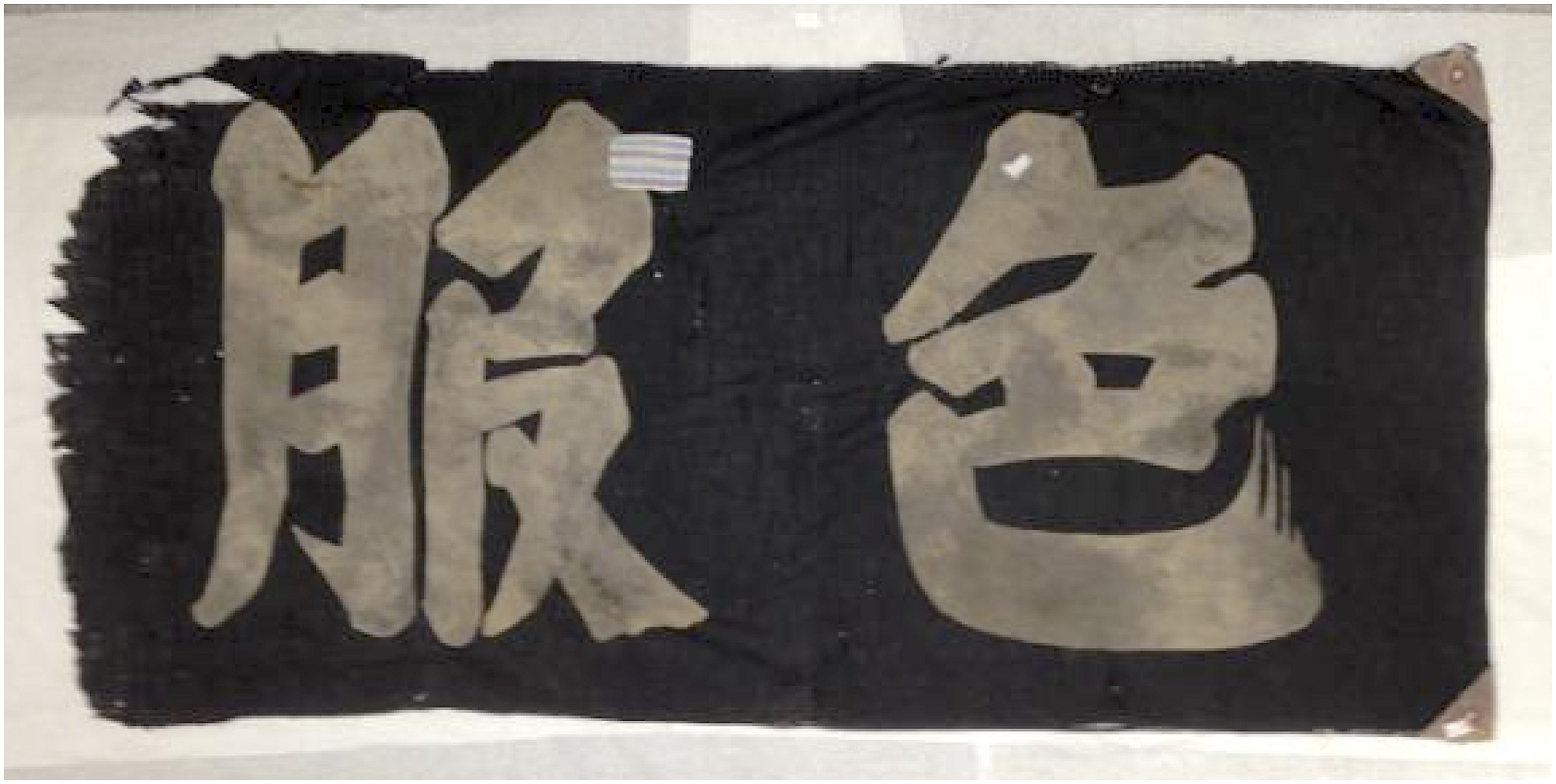
A banner from the Colored Clothes Campaign, with "色服" (색복; colored clothing) written on it. Now a National Registered Cultural Heritage of South Korea.

Beginning in the 1920s, the Japanese colonial government began efforts to ban the practice of wearing white clothes, in what has been dubbed the "Colored Clothes Campaign" or White Clothes Ban Movement (백의 폐지운동). Nam Yun-Suk counted the number of policies that prohibited or discouraged white clothes as follows:

Year	# policies
1920	2
1921	7
1922	4
1923	3
1924	0
1925	3
1926	2
1927	3
1928	0
1929	8
1930	7
1931	19
1932	13
1933	17
1934	11
1935	4
1936	3

Nam counted a total of 106 policies against the practice from 1920 to 1936. Reasons provided for these restrictions generally aligned with reasons given in debates amongst Korean intellectuals, although contemporary and current scholars have argued that assimilation of Koreans into Japanese identity could have been another unstated motivation.

However, restrictions were again resisted; after the 1919 March 1st Movement protests, there was a spike in Korean independence activism. The government embarked on a campaign to change the public image about the clothes. Flyers were handed out in public spaces that characterized the clothes as forbidden, embarrassing, and a hassle to maintain.

By the 1920s, the practice varied based on location. A 1926 survey by the Governor-General of Chōsen found that 50–60% people wore white in large towns and areas with access to main rail lines, while 70–95% of people in isolated rural areas wore white. Cho Heejin argues that the Colored Clothes Campaign had greater success in rural areas. In rural areas, public rallies were held where citizens were encouraged to wear colorful clothing. In 1935, the colonial government decided it wished to replicate the success of the rural efforts in the cities, and began stepping up their enforcement of the policies there. Police officers and public officials would spray or stamp ink on offenders, who were also often denied services like food rations and education. Despite this, the practice continued.

With the beginning of World War II, Japan made sweeping changes in Korea. Policies such as the 1938 State General Mobilization Law were enacted to maximize economic output. It applied the greatest amount of pressure on the enforcement of the ban beginning around 1940. In July 1945, amidst Allied air raids on Japan and Japan's impending loss of the war, a rally was held by the colonial government–backed newspaper Keijō Nippō. During the rally, officials warned Koreans that their white clothes would make them highly visible targets for bombers, and advised them to start wearing color.

=== End of the practice ===
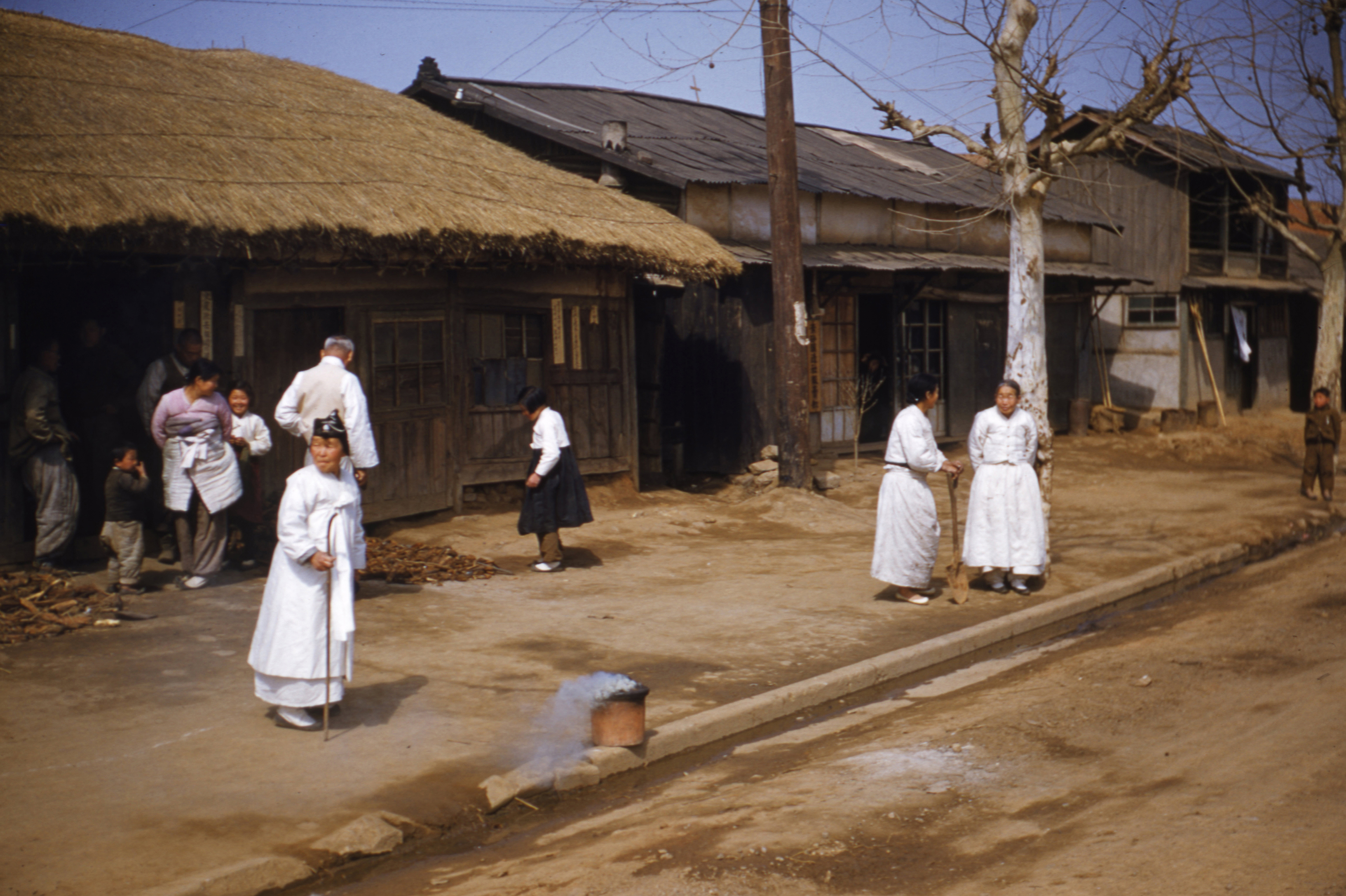
Elderly Korean women, wearing white, waiting for a bus around the end of the Korean War. Other people in the picture are wearing color. (1953)

Although Korea was liberated in 1945, it was immediately divided and placed under the rule of the Soviet Union and of the United States. In an effort to combat the division, some nationalists appealed to symbolism of the white clothes that had once unified the nation. Reunification efforts, including North Korea's invasion of the South in the 1950–1953 Korean War, failed.

After the war, both Koreas were among the poorest countries in the world. Koreans could no longer afford to maintain their white clothes, let alone afford food. In black markets, Koreans traded and highly valued U.S. military clothes, which they inconspicuously dyed other colors in order to avoid detection. The practice of wearing white clothes ended around this time.

== Symbolism ==
The clothes have been interpreted in various ways over time. The historian Choe Nam-seon saw the clothes as a symbol of Korean stubbornness. Yanagi Sōetsu reportedly viewed the color white as feminine. In the 1980s, South Korean democratic movements adopted the clothes as a symbol of democracy, pro-reunification sentiment, and anti-Americanism.

=== "White-clothed people" ===
- White-clothed people
- Hangul: 백의민족
- Hanja: 白衣民族
- RR: baeguiminjok
- MR: paegŭiminjok

White-clothed compatriots
- Hangul: 백의동포
- Hanja: 白衣同胞
- RR: baeguidongpo
- MR: paegŭidongp'o

In the early 1920s, the term paegŭiminjok (백의민족; lit. 'White-clothed people'), sometimes paegŭidongp'o (백의동포; 白衣同胞; lit. 'White-clothed compatriots'), began to be used to describe the Korean people.

Both terms express nationalism. The term minjok (ethnos, folk; lit. 'people clan') became popular due to the rise of the related Japanese term minzoku. Minzoku emerged during the 1880s to highlight the concept of a distinct and homogeneous Japanese identity. Koreans adopted and kept it, in spite of the fact that Japan ended up abandoning it in the short term to accommodate the assimilation of its non-Japanese colonial subjects. Dongpo also has a similar connotation; it can be literally translated as "born of the same womb".

These terms developed, alongside the Korean independence movement, as a reaction to the colonization of Korea. It symbolized a unique Korean identity, with millennia of continuity.

== Gallery ==
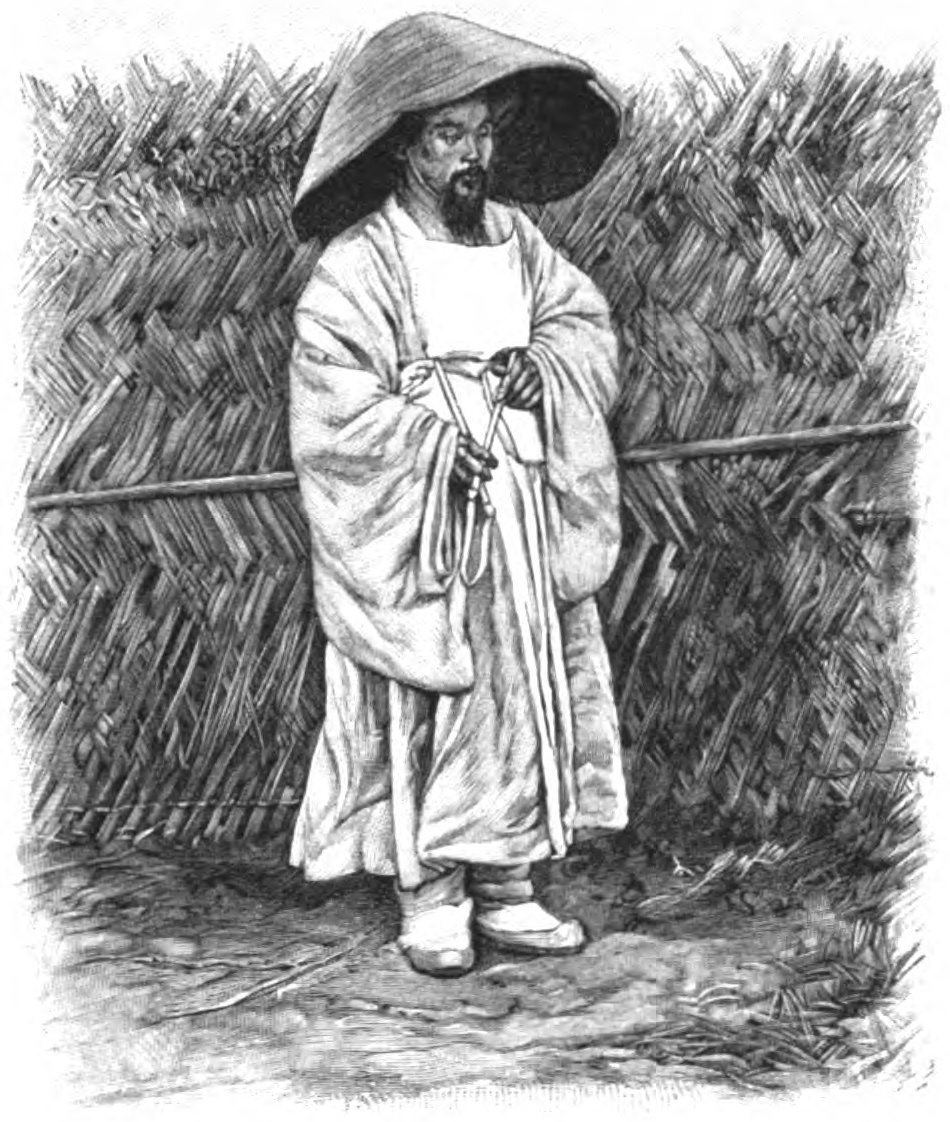
A French drawing of a Korean in mourning clothes (1894)

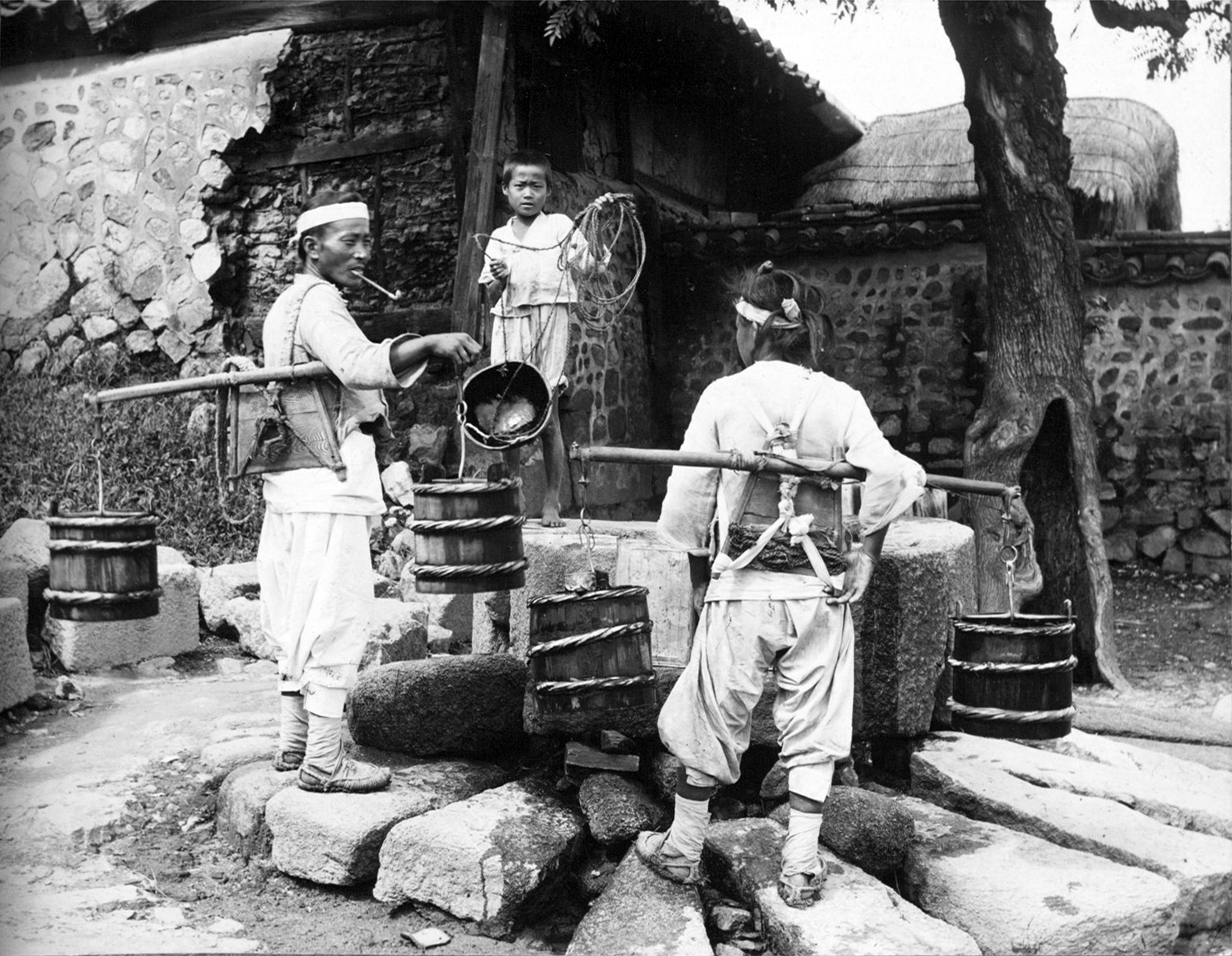
Korean commoners at a well (c. 1900)

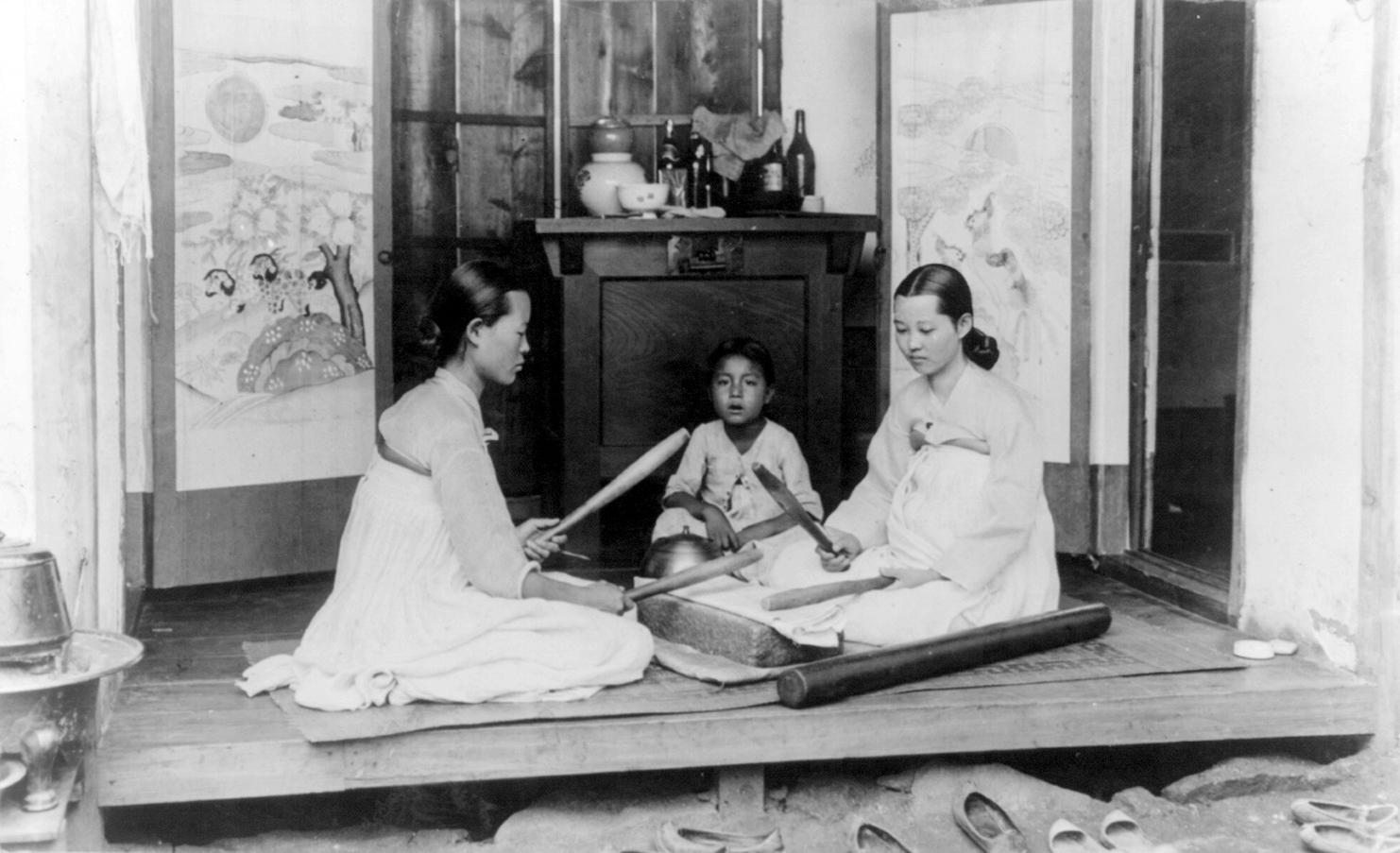
Korean women, wearing white, performing dadeumi (c. 1910s)

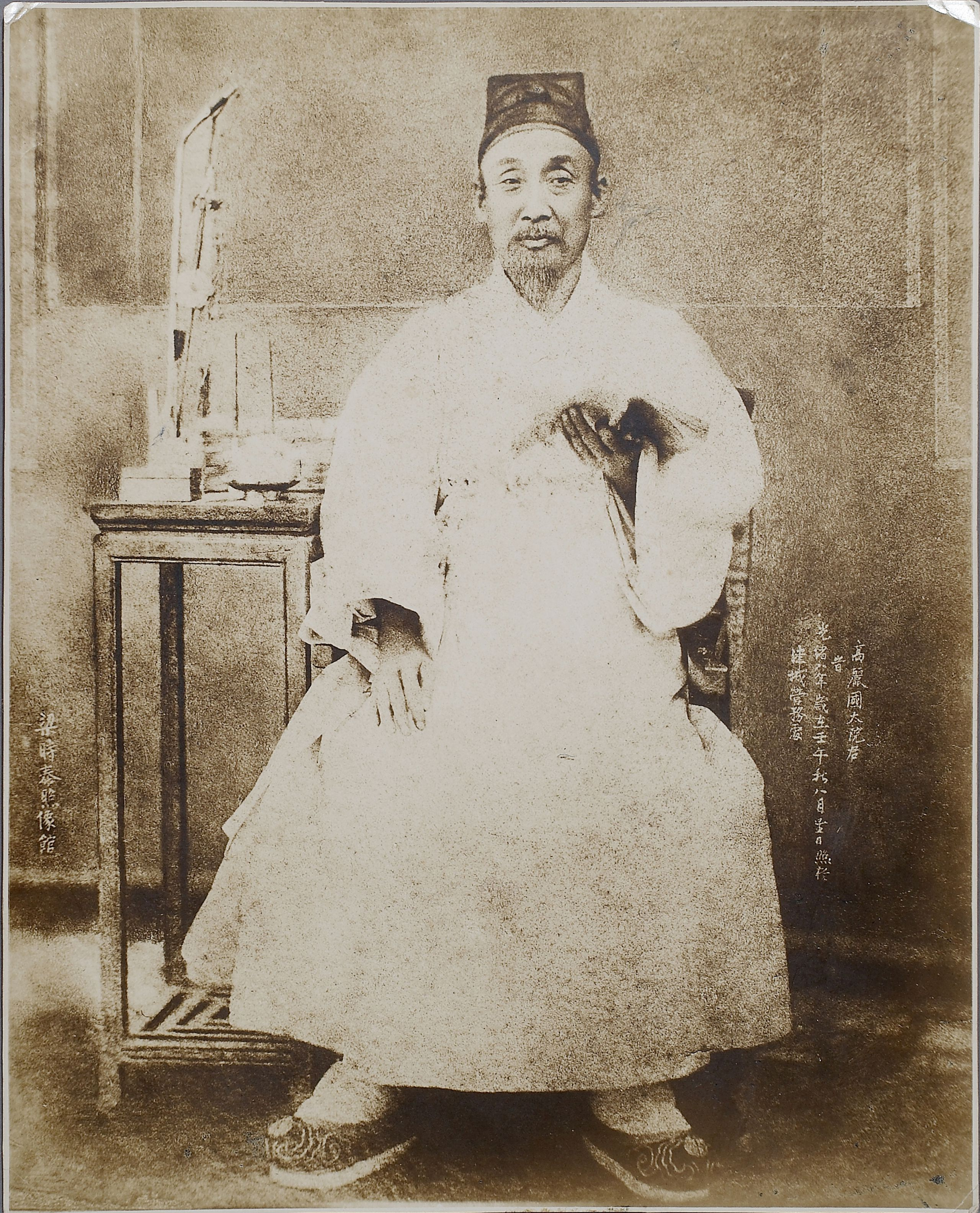
Heungseon Daewongun in Baoding (1883)

== See also ==
- List of Korean clothing
- Fashion in South Korea
