= Chima (clothing) =

Type of skirt

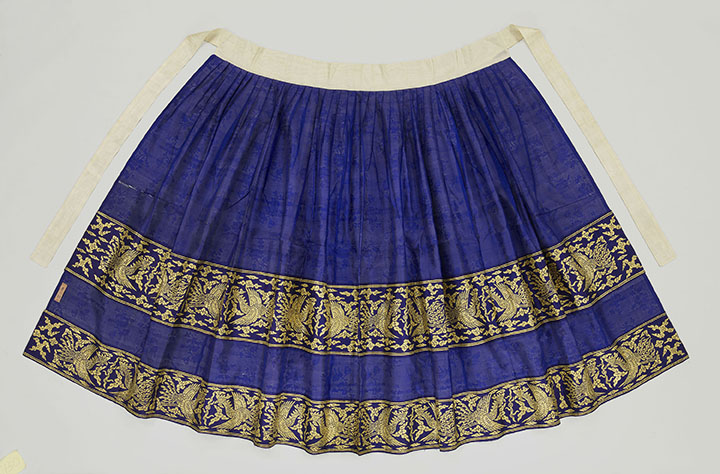
- Daeran Chima

Korean name
- Hangul: 치마
- RR: chima
- MR: ch'ima

Chima is a generic term for the skirt worn together with jeogori, or a short jacket in hanbok, Korean traditional clothing. It is also referred to as sang (裳) or gun (裙) in hanja in the Korean language. While the jeogori has evolved over time, the chima has remained relatively unchanged throughout time.

== History ==
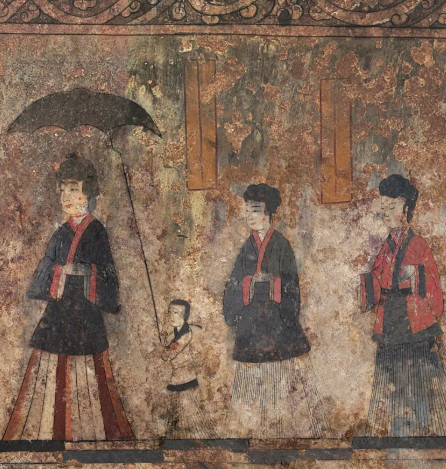
The Hanbok of a noblewoman from 5th-century Goguryeo murals is rooted in the attire of northern nomadic peoples, featuring a separate top and bottom with an A-line skirt.

Basic forms of ancient chima date back to the Goguryeo era (37 BC–668 AD). According to the murals of Goguryeo and an earthen toy excavated from the neighbourhood of Hwangnam-dong, Gyeongju, Goguryeo women usually wore the jeogori over the chima, covering the top of the chima.In addition, a painting of a woman wearing a saekdong chima can be seen in a mural tomb related to Goguryeo's figure Pungsokdo in Gangseo-gu, Nampo, North Korea. Later on in the Goguryeo Kingdom, the jeogori became shorter and shorter, showing off more of the chima.

In Silla, China's Tang dynasty influenced the culture of Koreans; In Tang dynasty, a popular fashion was to wear the skirt over the blouse for a slimming silhouette. This was different from the traditional Korean way of wearing Hanbok. Ancient Korean women would wear the chima (skirt) first, and then the jeogori (upper garment) over it, covering the skirt's waistband.

Several types of Tang dynasty's clothing was also introduced in Korea. The qixiong ruqun, a form of high-waist qun (a generic term for Chinese skirt) worn over a short Chinese jacket was introduced in Silla and in Balhae. This form of high-waist qun which ties to the chest can still be seen in the chima worn in present days Korean women's hanbok; it is also likely that the current women's hanbok has been derived from the Tang dynasty's high-waist qun with a short ru (Chinese: 襦) or from a later revival of the Tang dynasty fashion.

The Tang-influenced trend of wearing the skirt over the blouse did not last into the Goryeo dynasty. This method of wearing the skirt last can be considered a temporary phenomenon, popular primarily among the royalty and aristocracy of Silla after the unification of the Three Kingdoms. In conclusion, during the Goryeo period, the Tang-style influence began to wane, and the native Goguryeo style—the practice of wearing the upper garment over the skirt—was revived.

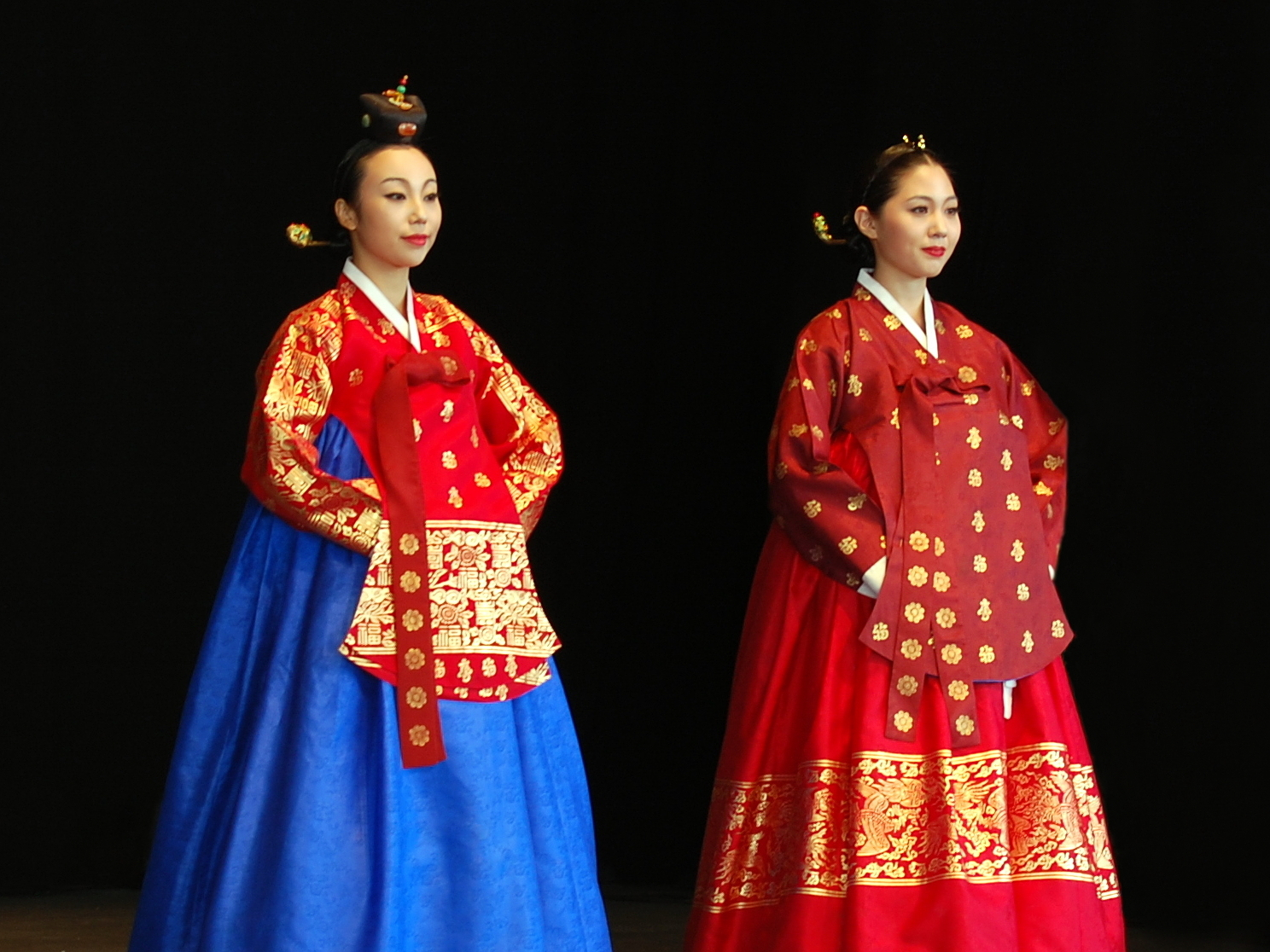
Wearing a chima (skirt) adorned with geumbak (gold leaf), a luxurious decoration technique once reserved for the royal family during the Joseon dynasty.

The hanbok of the Joseon period was fundamentally a continuation of the sartorial traditions established during the preceding Goguryeo and Goryeo dynasties. The basic structure, consisting of the jeogori (jacket), baji (trousers) for men, and chima (skirt) for women, was inherited and served as the foundation upon which Joseon-era styles evolved. During the Joseon dynasty, the chima (skirt) adopted fuller volume, while the jeogori (upper garment) took a more tightened and shortened form, features quite distinct from the hanbok of earlier eras like Goguryeo and Goryeo, when the chima had a more natural A-line silhouette and the jeogori was baggy and long, reaching well below waist level.

== Design and construction ==
=== Silhouette ===
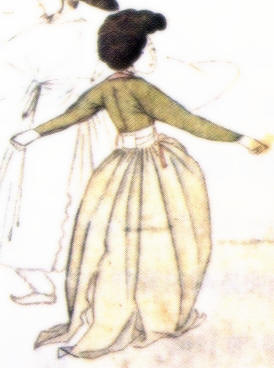
A traditional women's hanbok comprises a chima (skirt) and a jeogori (upper garment)

The chima is a floor length wrap around skirt with a wide waistband positioned above the chest. With the high placement of the waistband it allows the skirt to have a more billowy look, which can give greater freedom of movement. Traditionally, women needed to wear about five to seven layers of undergarments which consisted of pants and underskirts, this made the skirt look more voluminous and provide a more elegant look.

There are different kinds of chima: single-layered, double-layered, and quilted. Furthermore, pul-chima refers to a chima with a separated back, whereas a tong-chima has a seamed back. The upper class usually use ramie as the fabric to make for summer chima while plain and patterned silks are used throughout the remainder of the year. By contrast, commoners were restricted to using cotton for their chima. Women in the upper class wore a long chima which falls down to the floor while women in the lower class wore a shorter chima which length reaches to the calf of the leg. Korean noblewomen wore full length chima to designate their social status.

=== Colour ===
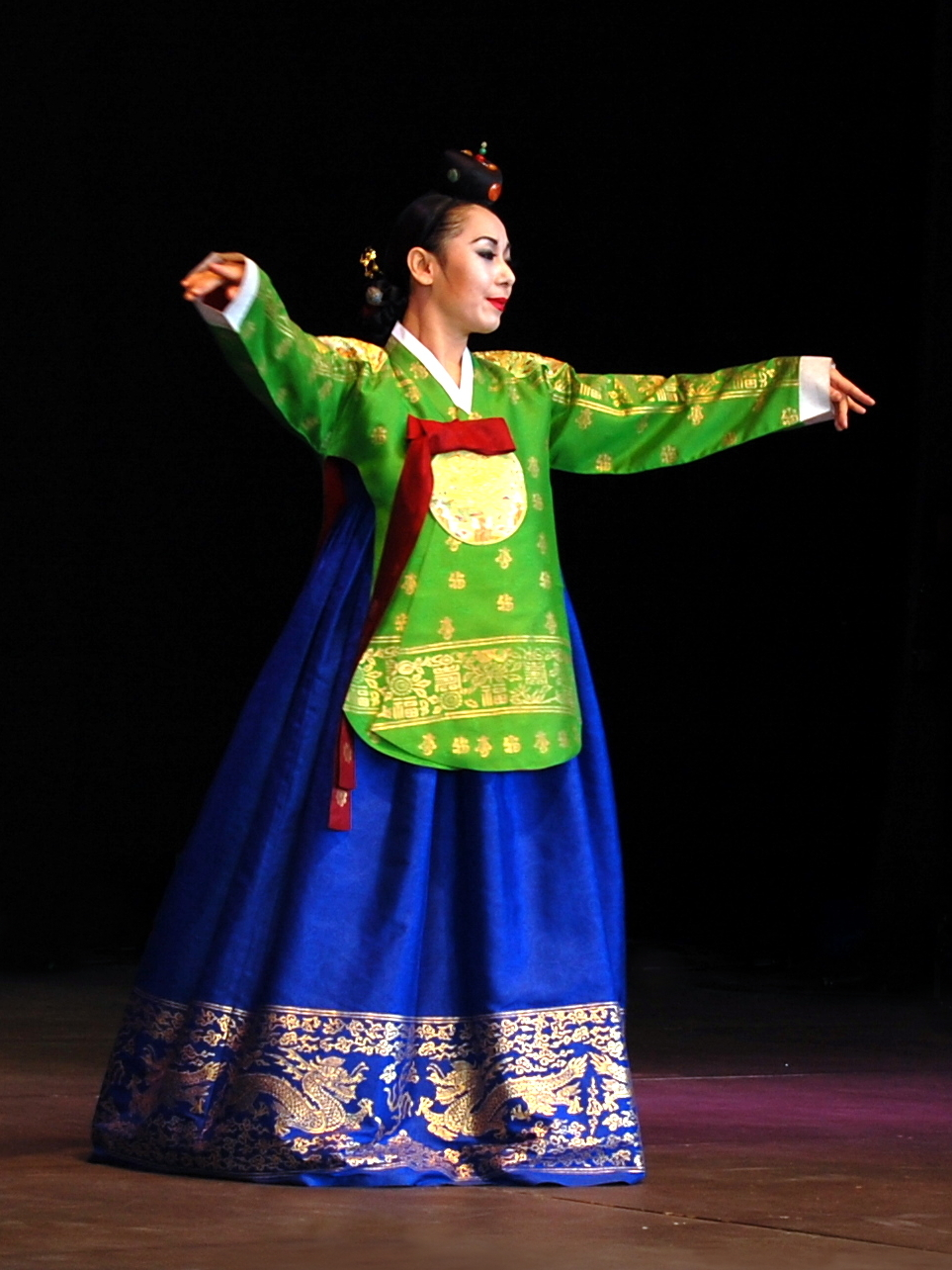
Blue chima decorated with geumbak worn with a dangui, a style of royal costume.

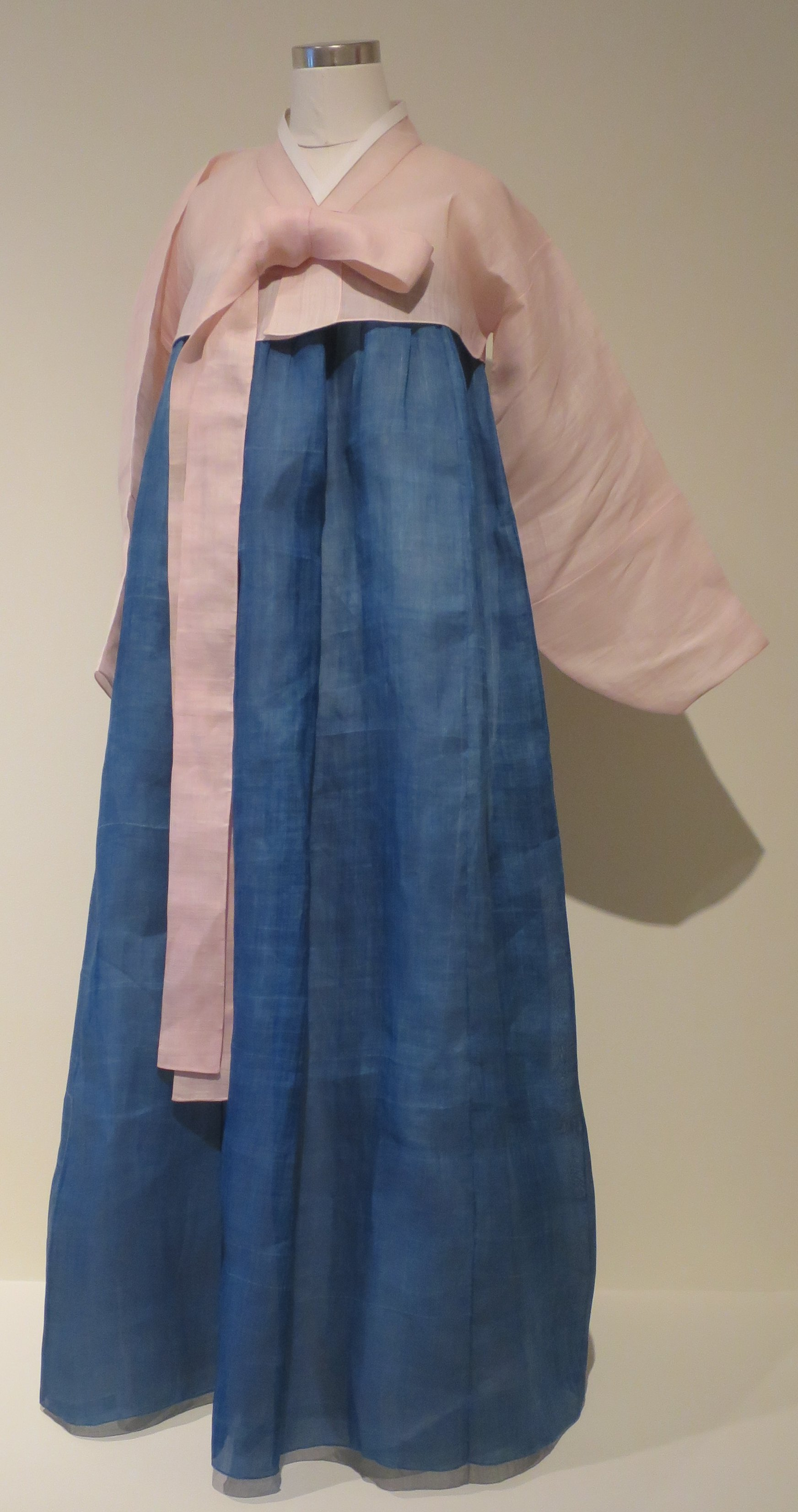
Plain blue chima with light pink jeogori made of plain weave mosi or ramie, early 20th century

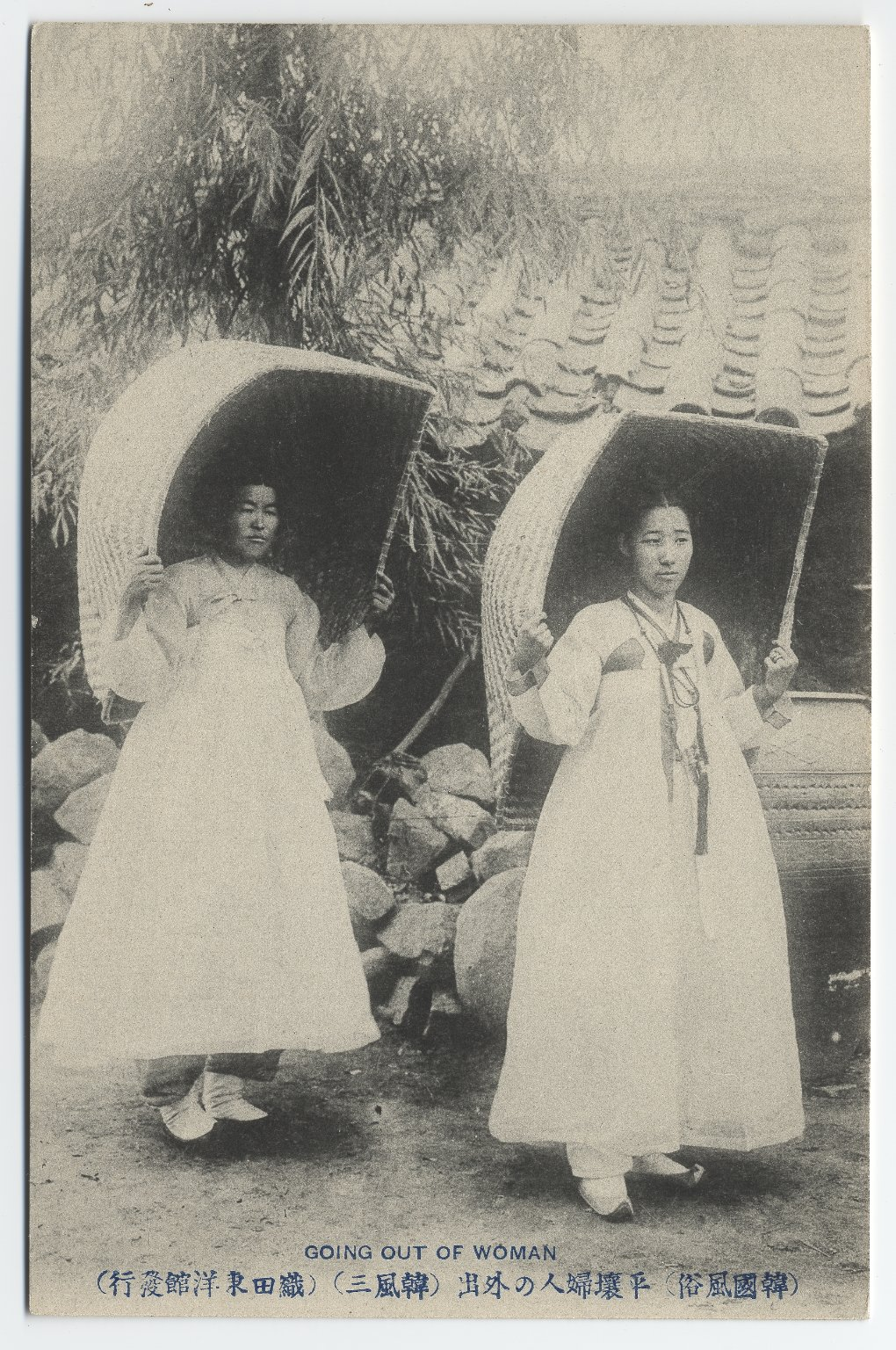
Women going out in white chima and jeogori, Pyeongyang, North Korea, c.1904

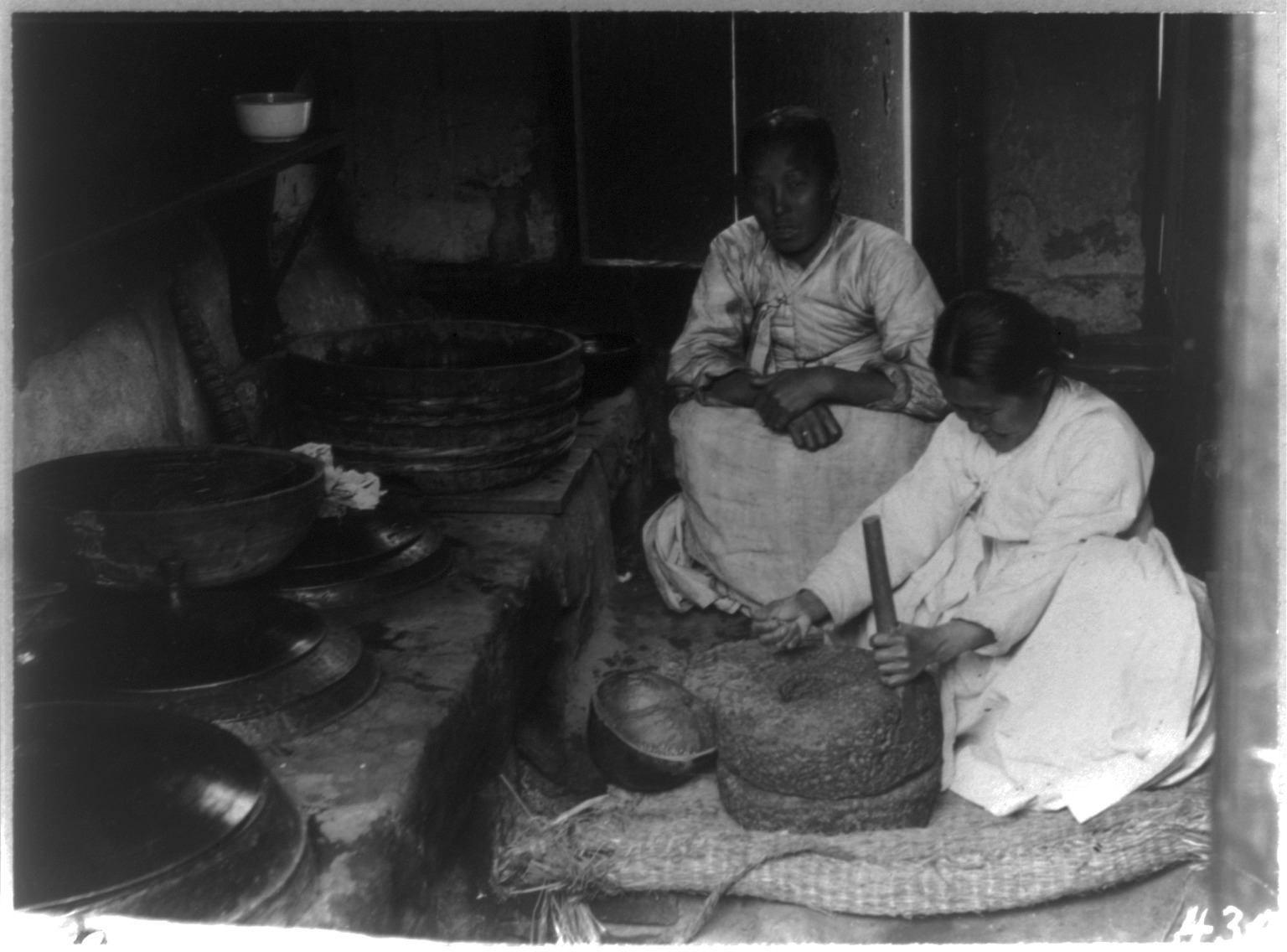
Kitchen women in white chima and jeogori, between 1910 and 1920

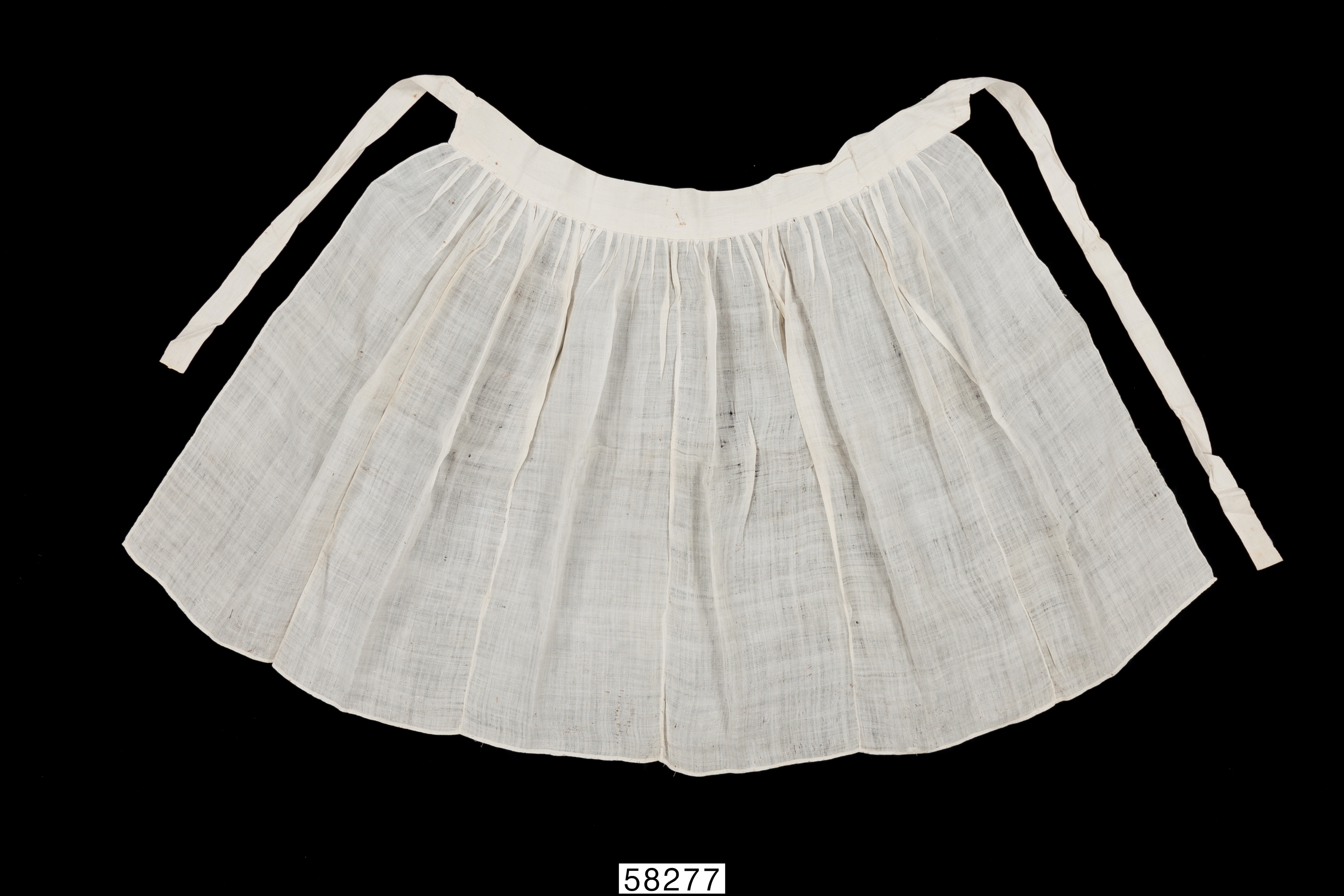
mosi or Ramie chima

Different colours and lengths indicated important social distinctions such as: age, marital status, and class. Girls and unmarried women usually wore red skirts, while married women and middle-aged women wore blue skirts and elderly women wore gray skirts.

From the Goguryeo to Joseon periods, chima have been striped, pleated, patchworked, gored and decorated with uniquely Korean geumbak(gold leaf) patterns. This traditional Korean technique of stamping gold leaf with woodblocks was applied to the garments of royalty and nobility and has its origins even before the Three Kingdoms period.

Goguryeo women also wore saekdong chima that is a colourfully striped skirt by patchworking, and a chima in form of gored skirt, made by sewing several pieces of fabric without gathering.

The use of primary colours in hanbok, and more specifically in chima, was typically preferred by the ruling class and people who came from the upper, privileged, social class. Korean commoners rarely wore primary coloured hanbok, and they were only allowed to wear it for special occasions, such as seasonal festivals, weddings, and for ceremonial events. Nowadays, the hanbok worn by Korean is colourful due to the Western influences which Korean to become a free society where Koreans could choose what and what colours they want to wear. Wearing colourful hanbok is, however, a clear contrast from the traditional use of white hanbok.

For thousands of years and nearly exclusively, most Koreans only wore white clothes. They donned colored clothing on special occasions. In Korean culture, white has traditionally been a symbol of nobility and innocence; and a result, Koreans would wear white during their lives from birth to death. Moreover, the Korean commoners' clothing were mainly un-dyed and plain. Korean people often being nicknamed "the white clad [people]".

Within the Korean tradition, the perception of baeksaek (white) was broad enough to encompass sosaek (neutral color), the inherent color of unprocessed natural materials. Sosaek represents the concept of being musaeku (uncolored), referring to the native hue of textiles such as cotton and hemp, free from artificial dyes or modern bleaching processes. Consequently, the term for Korean baegui(white clothes), denotes a range of shades from a very light cream to a light tan.

In Goryeo and Joseon, the use of white clothing was banned by King Chung Yeol in the 13th century and by many Joseon kings which even included King Sejong, but this did not stop the tradition of wearing white clothing to continue until the early 20th century.

The application of traditional Korean baegui (white clothing) was exceptionally broad. It encompassed the everyday attire of commoners, the informal and scholarly robes of the yangban (aristocracy), and the sacred vestments worn by priests and participants in religious rites. A wealth of historical sources and artworks from the Joseon dynasty attests to the prevalence of white attire among the elite. This included not only the dopo as casual wear (pyeonbok) and the simui as the scholar's ceremonial robe (beopbok), but often extended to the sibok, the official's work uniform. While colored garments were certainly worn by the upper echelons to denote rank or for official functions, white remained their principal choice for daily life.

Throughout the Japanese colonial period, the act of wearing baegui served as a symbol of defiance, representing a means of asserting national identity in opposition to colonial authority. The colonial government coercively suppressed this tradition. Measures of suppression included imposing administrative penalties on individuals in white, prohibiting their entry into government buildings, and even publicly humiliating them by splattering ink on their attire on market days. In Modern times, the use of white hanbok is often associated with resistance and is mostly worn for funerals.

== See also ==
- Chima jeogori
- Baji (clothing)
- Dangui
- Wonsam
- Hwarot
- Qun (Chinese: 裙)– Chinese equivalent
