= Bhajji (disambiguation) =

Bhajji is the Indian snack food item, akin to pakoras (Indian fritters).

Bhajji may also refer to:

- Bhajji (princely state), former princely state in India
- Bikaneri Bhujia, or simply Bhujia, a famous Indian snack item
- Harbhajan Singh (born 1980), nickname Bhajji or Bhaji, Indian cricketer

== See also ==
- Bhaji (disambiguation)
- Baji (disambiguation)
- Bargee or bargeman, person working on a barge boat
