= Chima jeogori =

Korean traditional women's clothing

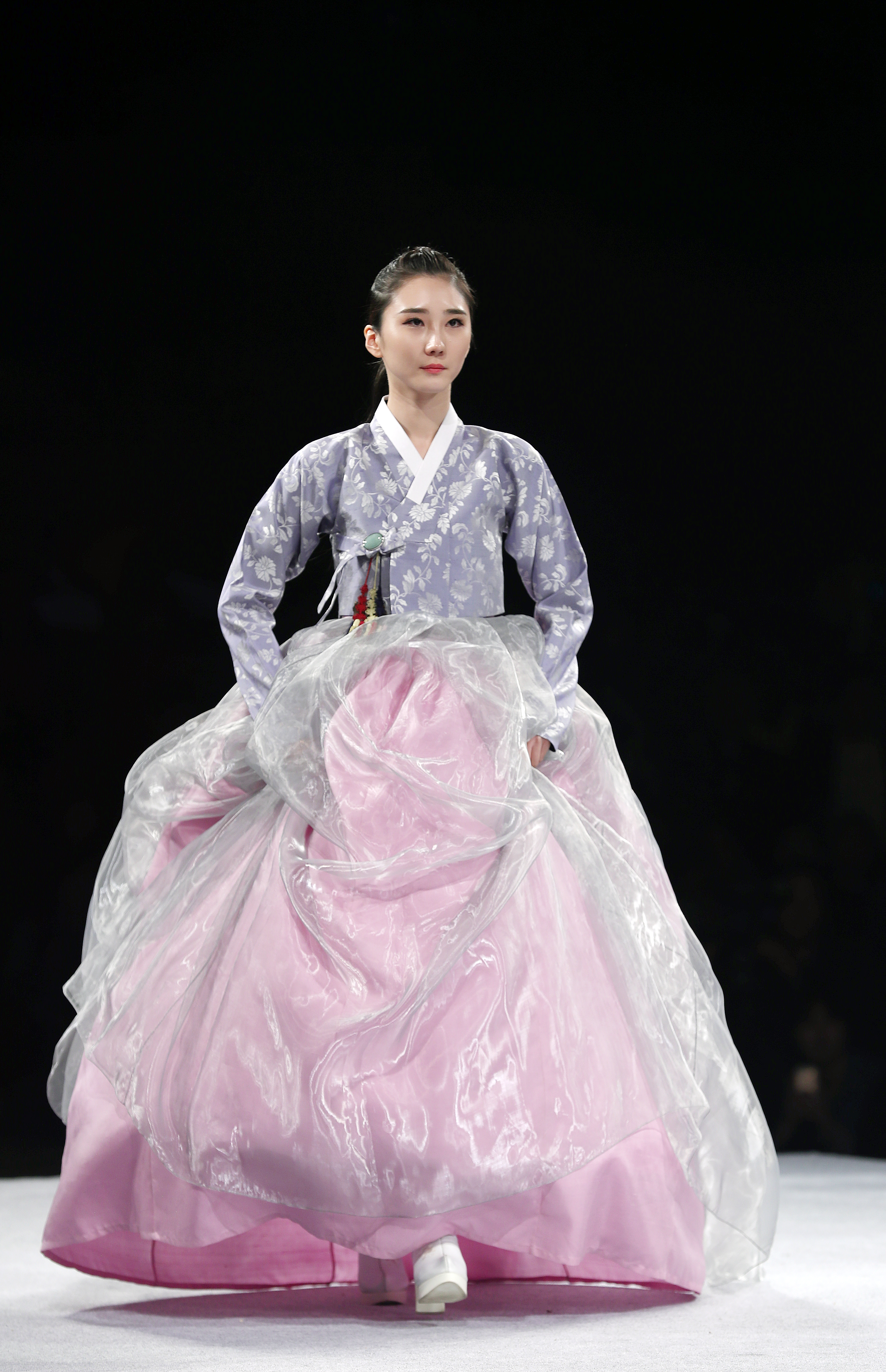

Korean name
- Hangul: 치마저고리
- RR: chimajeogori
- MR: ch'imajŏgori

Chima jeogori (Korean: 치마저고리) refers to a traditional outfit for Korean women, which consists of a chima skirt and jeogori top. It is not a national costume per se, but a form of hanbok, the traditional Korean form of dress. Similarly, men wear baji jeogori: baji (baggy pants) and jeogori.

== History ==
At the end of the 19th century, the tongchima (통치마), seamless one-piece short skirt, came out for convenience. School girls used to wear a white jeogori and a black tongchima in modern educational institutions. This fashion gradually faded out in South Korea while revived and continues in North Korea.

=== In Japan ===
In Japan, some ethnic Korean minority schools use a girls' uniform that is based on tongchima. This form of chima jeogori is modified into white shirt and shorter ankle length black or blue dress.

The uniforms sometimes made them target for hate crimes. Children wearing them were sometimes beaten, insulted, or even had their skirts slashed with knives. This led to schools eventually issuing two sets of uniforms: a chima jeogori for inside the school, and more typical blazers and skirts for outside the school (Japanese: 第2制服, lit. 'second uniform').

== See also ==
- Culture of Korea
- List of Korean clothing
- Ruqun and/or qixiong ruqun– Chinese equivalent
