= Bhaji (disambiguation) =

Bhaji or Bhajji may refer to:

- Bhaji, an Indian version of vegetable fritters
- Pav bhaji, Indian vegetable dish (bhaji) served with pav (bread)
- Baji (food), a type of beaten rice eaten in Nepal
- Amaranth, or Bhaji in Trinidad and Tobago, a cosmopolitan genus of herbs
- Harbhajan Singh (born 1980), an Indian cricketer, nicknamed Bhajji or Bhaji
- For "crewman of a working barge" see bargee or wikt:bargee

== See also ==
- Bhajji (disambiguation)
- Baji (disambiguation)
- Bikaneri bhujia, a fried snack from Bikaner, India
