= Tari Ito =

Japanese artist (1951–2021)

- イトー・ターリ
- Born: Miwako Ito (伊藤 美和子); 1951; Tokyo, Japan
- Died: 22 December 2021 (age 70)
- Known for: Performance Art
- Notable work: Self-Portrait (自画像)
- Awards: 2011 Yayori Journalist Award Winner

Tari Ito (イトー・ターリ, Itō Tāri; 1951 – 22 September 2021) was a Japanese performance artist, activist, and organizer based in Tokyo who presented her work in Asia, North America, and Europe. She was one of the few openly lesbian artists in Japan.

== Biography ==
Ito was born in 1951 in Tokyo, as Miwako Ito. She studied arts at Wako University between 1970 and 1974. During her third year at the university, Ito first began performing pantomime after joining a theatre course. After graduation, she continued her training for around eight years. Ito took the artist name Tari Ito, inspired by the muse Thalia after reading a poem by Jean Cocteau. She also became aware that she was a lesbian during the same timeframe, but only came out in 1996.

She performed as a pantomime artist Japan and the Netherlands before becoming active as a performance artist in the late 1980s, and as a feminist and lesbian artist since the 1990s. She established and founded the Women's Art Network (WAN) in 1994 in Tokyo, which organized Women Breaking Boundaries 21, an exhibition of women artists from Japan and other parts of Asia in 2001. Ito set up PA/F (Performance Art/Feminism) Space in 2003.

Ito's performance and artistic practice focused on exploring sexuality, military violence against women, and the fear of radiation exposure after Fukushima nuclear disaster in 2011. Her work "has continued to draw on themes and materials from daily life to produce live performance artworks that she believes can become catalysts for change".

Since 2010, Ito had amyotrophic lateral sclerosis. In 2013, Ito was diagnosed with spinal muscular atrophy. Despite the limited mobility caused by the degenerative neurological conditions, she continued performing during that time. By 2020, she required the use of a wheelchair. Ito died from ALS complications on 22 September 2021, at the age of 70.

In 2022, on the one-year anniversary of Ito's death, an exhibit about her life was held in Koganei, Tokyo.

== Work ==
In 1996, Ito performed Self-Portrait (自画像) at various venues in Japan, and as part of Womanifesto in Bangkok, Thailand, in 1997 and 1999. Ito considers the piece, in which she comes out as lesbian, as a "turning point" in her career. Other performances include Memory of Epidermis (1994), Me Being Me (1999), Where is the Fear (2001), I Would Not Forget You (2006), One Response (2008-2010), One Response for Bae Bong-gi and Countless Other Women (ひとつの応答 ぺポンギさんと数えきれない女たち) (2012), and Before the 37 Trillion Pieces Get to Sleep (37兆個が眠りに就くまえに) (2019).

Her work has been featured in the 3rd Nippon International Performance Art Festival NIPAF '96 (1996), and the exhibitions Womanifesto and Womanifesto II (1999), Text and Subtext (2000-2003), Women Breaking Boundaries 21 (2001), and Women In-Between (2012).
