= Munni Baji =

Pakistani radio artist

- منی باجی
- Born: Parveen Akhtar; 28 February 1929; Shimla, Punjab, British India, India
- Died: 14 May 2007 (aged 78); Karachi, Sindh, Pakistan
- Other name: Munni Baji
- Years active: 1942 – 2007
- Relatives: Maqsood Hassan (brother)
- Awards: Ilyas Rashidi Lifetime Achievement Gold Medal

Munni Baji (Urdu: منی باجی) of Radio Pakistan (1929 – 14 May 2007) was a Pakistani artist who remained associated with the radio for almost 45 years and retired in 1993, but worked on contracts till 1998. She received Ilyas Rashidi's Nigar Award for her services.

== Early life ==
She was born Parveen Akhtar in Shimla, Punjab, British India in 1929. Even as an adult, she was just 50 inches tall and had a child-like voice. She started her career as a comedian in Delhi as a radio artist on All India Radio in the early 1940s.

== Career ==
She migrated to Pakistan with her family in 1947. Munni Baji first lived in Lahore in order to claim the lost property through the Ministry of Rehabilitation, Government of Pakistan. She was introduced to Radio Pakistan, Karachi by the poet Behzad Lucknavi who was a family friend and was already working for Radio Pakistan. While there, she worked for two years on radio in Lahore, as a drama artist with the help of Zia Jullundri, another radio personality.

In 1955, after receiving the lost property, she shifted to the Ratan Talao area in Karachi along with her family. Her residence was just behind the Radio Pakistan building. In Karachi, she had people that she knew from Delhi. Veteran broadcaster Z. A. Bokhari was a friend of her grandfather and helped her a lot. Her grandfather who was allotted a canteen at the government offices, handed over the canteen to her brother Maqsood and her.

She temporarily left the Radio work in order to run the canteen. However, she later returned to Radio Pakistan in 1958.

She accepted the kid roles in dramas for Radio Pakistan due to her child-like voice. She did many drama serials including Qaid-e-Havas and Zanjeer Bolti Hai. She also did children programme Naunehaal, for more than 30 years whose name was later changed to Bachchon Ki Duniya. Bachchon Ki Duniya is still remembered by the young-ones of the 1970s and 1980s. During the same period, she regularly voiced in children's radio program called "Tot Batot" from Radio Pakistan Karachi. Bachon ki Duniya and Tot Batot were produced by Syeda Naz Kazmi (producer at Radio Pakistan Karachi). She once did a TV programme Badon Ke Liye for a private company.

Her poor health forced her to retire in 1993 but she worked on contracts till 1998 and 2007.

== Personal life ==
Munni did not marry and had devoted all her life to raising her two brothers and sister and her younger brother Maqsood Hassan was also an actor.

== Illness and death ==
She died from heart failure on 14 May 2007 in Karachi and was laid to rest at Milk Plant graveyard.

== Tribute ==
Qazi Wajid paid tribute to her calling her a big sister and supporter. Talat Hussain described her a great artiste that she inspired many generations who also said that he was an admirer of her work.

== Awards and recognition ==
Year	Award	Category	Result	Title	Ref.
1999	Nigar Award	Ilyas Rashidi Lifetime Achievement Gold Medal	Won	Herself	
