= Baji Rao =

Baji Rao may refer to

- Baji Rao I (1700-1740), Peshwa of the Indian Marathas
- Balaji Baji Rao ("Nanasaheb") (1720-1761), Peshwa of the Indian Marathas
- Baji Rao II (1775-1851), last Peshwa of the Indian Marathas
- Bajirao Singham, fictional Indian police officer in the Singham film series

== See also ==
- Bajirao Mastani, 2015 Indian epic historical romance film by Sanjay Leela Bhansali, about Bajirao I and his wife Mastani
  - Bajirao Mastani (soundtrack), its soundtrack by Bhansali
- Bajirao Mastani (TV series), an Indian television show about the ruler and his wife aired on Colors Marathi
