= Baaji (TV series) =

Marathi-language historical series

- Genre: Historical; Drama
- Starring: See below
- Country of origin: India
- Original language: Marathi
- No. of episodes: 144

Production
- Producer: Santosh Kolhe
- Production locations: Mumbai, Maharashtra, India
- Camera setup: Multi-camera
- Running time: 22 minutes
- Production company: The Film Clique

Original release
- Network: Zee Marathi
- Release: 30 July 2018 – 12 January 2019

Baaji is an Indian Marathi language historical television series which aired on Zee Marathi. It premiered from 30 July 2018 by replacing Naammatra. It starred Nupur Daithankar and Abhijeet Shwetchandra in lead roles.

== Cast ==
- Nupur Daithankar as Hira
- Abhijeet Shwetchandra as Baaji
- Prakhar Singh as Shera
- Adarsh Kadam as Chichoka
- Milind Pemgirikar as Biniwale
- Rajesh Aher as Dadaji
- Vaidehi Mohole as Chandra
- Veena Katti
- Kiran Bhalerao
- Tejas Ghadge
- Bhakti Rasal
