= Jeogori =

Traditional Korean garment

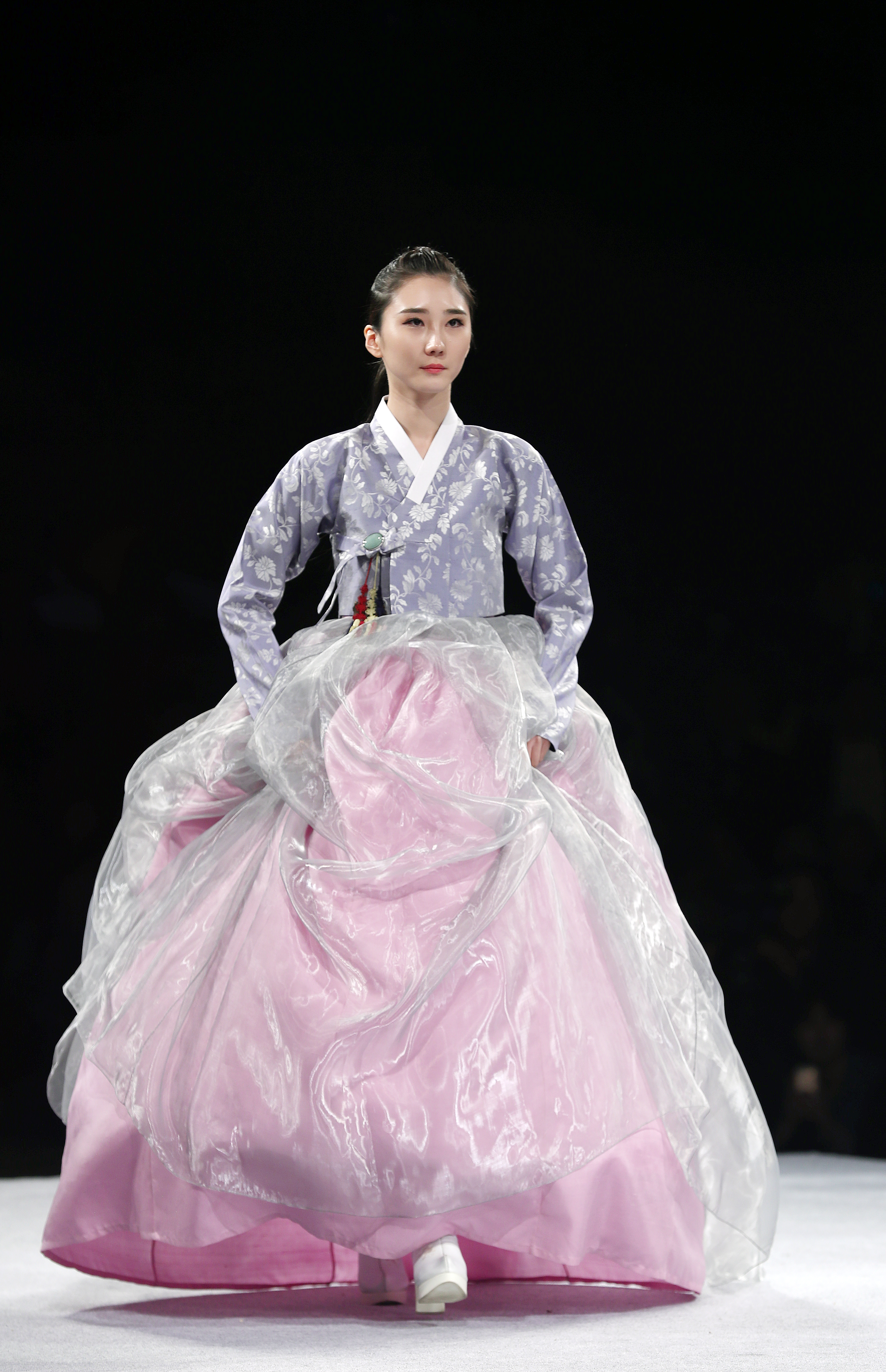
- A jeogori with goreum (ribbon)

Korean name
- Hangul: 저고리
- RR: jeogori
- MR: chŏgori

Jeogori or tseogori (Korean: 저고리; Korean pronunciation: [t͡ɕʌ̹ɡo̞ɾi]) is a basic upper garment of the hanbok, a traditional Korean garment, which has been worn by both men and women. Men usually wear the jeogori with a baji or pants while women wear the jeogori with chima, or skirts. It covers the arms and upper part of the wearer's body.

== Etymology ==
The jeogori has been worn since ancient times and went by a variety of names such as yu (유; 襦; lit. 'jacket'), boksam (복삼; 複杉), and wihae (위해; 尉解) in the Three Kingdoms period (57 BC – 668 AD).

Although it is unknown when the term jeogori began to be used to refer to the garment, it is assumed to have appeared in the late Goryeo period around King Chungnyeol's reign. The first historical document to mention the jeogori is in the Cheonjeonui (천전의; 遷奠儀) of Queen Wongyeong, which was a funeral ceremony for carrying the coffin out of the palace. The document written in 1420 during the second reign of Sejong the Great records jeokgori (적고리; 赤古里) and danjeokgori (단적고리; 短赤古里). However, it is not clear whether the record is a hanja transliteration of a Korean word or Mongolian influence. Before the Goryeo period, such an upper garment was referred to as wihae (위해; 尉解; Chinese: 尉解; pinyin: wèijiě) in Silla. As the uihae was a transliteration of the Silla language, dialect forms such as uti and uchi still remain to present.

== Composition ==
Jeogori composition: 1. hwajang 2. godae 3. kkeutdong (somae buri) 4. somae 5. goreum 6. u 7. doryeon 8, 11. jindong 9. gil 10. baerae 12. git 13. dongjeong

Traditionally, a jeogori is made out of leather, woolen fabrics, silk, hemp or ramie. Modern Korean designers sometimes use other materials such as lace. There are several types of jeogori according to fabric, sewing technique, and shape.

The basic form of a jeogori consists of gil (길), git (깃), dongjeong (동정), goreum (고름) and sleeves somae: the gil is the large section of the garment in both front and back side and git is a band of fabric that trims the collar. The dongjeong is a removable white collar placed over the end of the git and is generally squared off. The goreum are coat strings attached to the breast part to tie the jeogori. Women's jeogori may have kkeutdong (끝동), a different coloured cuff placed on the end of the sleeves. The form of jeogori has been changed as time goes by.

== History ==
The indigenous attire of the Korean people belongs to the Northern lineage, with a basic structure consisting of trousers(baji, 바지) and jeogori(top). In particular, the jeogori exhibits characteristics common to Northern-style clothing, such as a straight collar(직령) and narrow sleeves(착수).

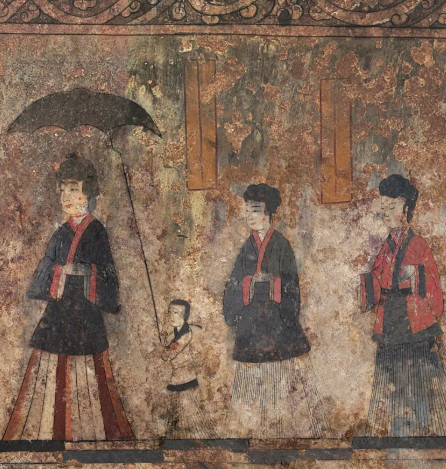
The Hanbok of a noblewoman from 5th-century Goguryeo murals is rooted in the attire of northern nomadic peoples, featuring a separate top(Jeogori) and bottom(Baji) with an A-line skirt.

The actual appearance of the jeogori from ancient times can be observed in Goguryeo tomb murals dating from the 4th to 6th centuries. The jeogori depicted in these murals is distinctive: it is long enough to reach below the waist and is secured with a belt. It features borders(선) made of a contrasting fabric along the narrow sleeve cuffs, hemline, collar, and front panels(섭).

Another notable characteristic is the lack of a strict distinction between the jeogori and the po(outer robe); simply extending the length of the jeogori would effectively transform it into a po. These features were common across the Three Kingdoms.

The original silhouette for banbok jeogori shared similarities with the clothing of the ancient nomadic people of Eurasia due to the cultural exchanges that ancient Koreans had with the Scythians. The ancient jeogori had an open form, a collar which crossed to the left (좌임; 左衽), narrow sleeves, and was hip-length which were similar features found in the Scythian clothing-style. Some ancient jeogori also had a front central closure similar to a kaftan; this form of jeogori with a central closure is mostly found during the Goguryeo period and was worn by people of lower status.

After a period in which both left-side and right-side closures were used interchangeably, the treatment of the front overlapping panel(seop, 섭) was standardized to the right-side closure(우임) during the Joseon Dynasty.

The change in collars direction from right-to-left (i.e. left closure) to left-over-right (i.e. right closure), along with the use of wide sleeves, which are found in some jackets and coats were due ancient Chinese influences; these Chinese influences on the top are reflected and depicted in Goguryeo paintings.

The Top of the Ruling class of Silla was influenced from Chinese fashions of Tang influence in the Silla Dynasty by Kim Chun-Chu (648CE). But the most commoners wore only a style of indigenous jeogori distinct from that of the Ruling class of Silla.

During the Goryeo period, the Tang-influenced style of wearing the skirt over the top started to fade, leading to the revival of the native Goguryeo style(wearing the Jeogori over the skirt) within the aristocrat class. And jeogori became shorter, with slimmer sleeves.

=== Joseon ===
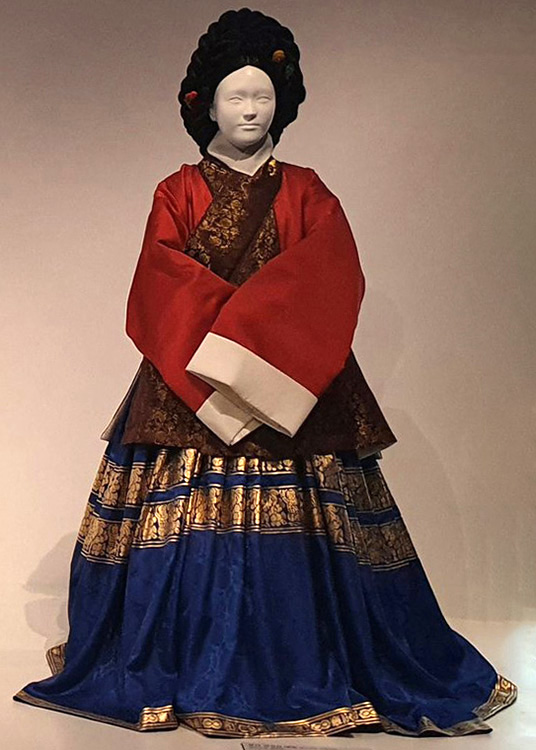
early Joseon dynasty royal Hanbok. A style continuing from the Goryeo period, featuring an A-line skirt adorned with geumbak (gold leaf), a spacious waist-length upper garment, and a dongjeong (white strip) on the collar.

In the Joseon Period, jeogori lengths and style fluctuated depending on current fashion and social standing.

In the 16th century, women's jeogori were long, wide, and covered the waist. The length of women's jeogori gradually shortened. A heoritti (허리띠) or jorinmal (졸잇말) was worn to cover the chest. This was to fit in style with a large wig and skirt.

== Modern styles ==
In contemporary Korea, the sumptuary laws within different social classes were lifted and colours, decorations, and fabrics that were exclusive to the upper classes were open to all classes. This allowed for the growth of diverse traditional design elements in hanbok styles. However, in the 20th and 21st centuries, the traditional Korean clothing has not been worn every day by most people. The hanbok became more reserved for special events, such as ceremonial or bridal wear, which carries onto current time. During their own engagement celebrations, women may wear pink jeogori. After they are married, women may wear indigo jeogori. Additionally, modern silhouettes are commonly slimmer and more simplified than historical styles.

== Gallery ==
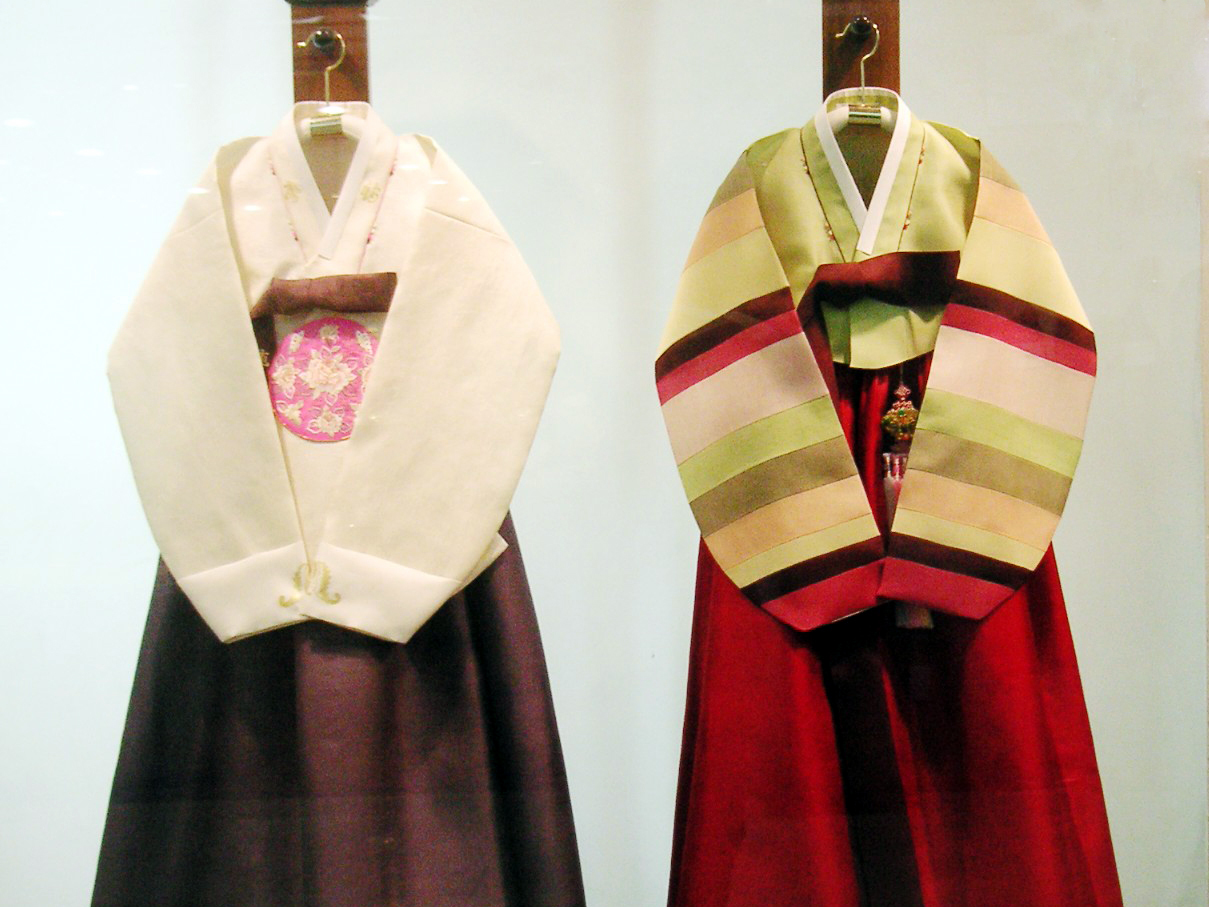
Jeogori for women

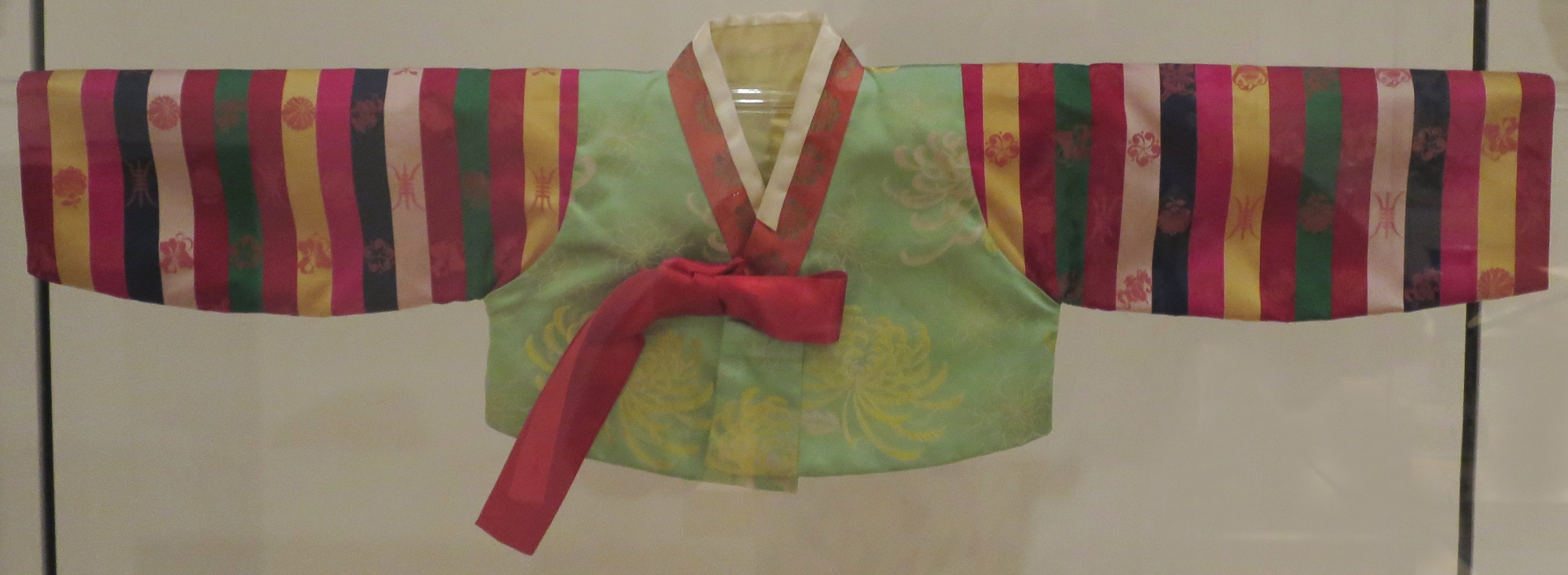

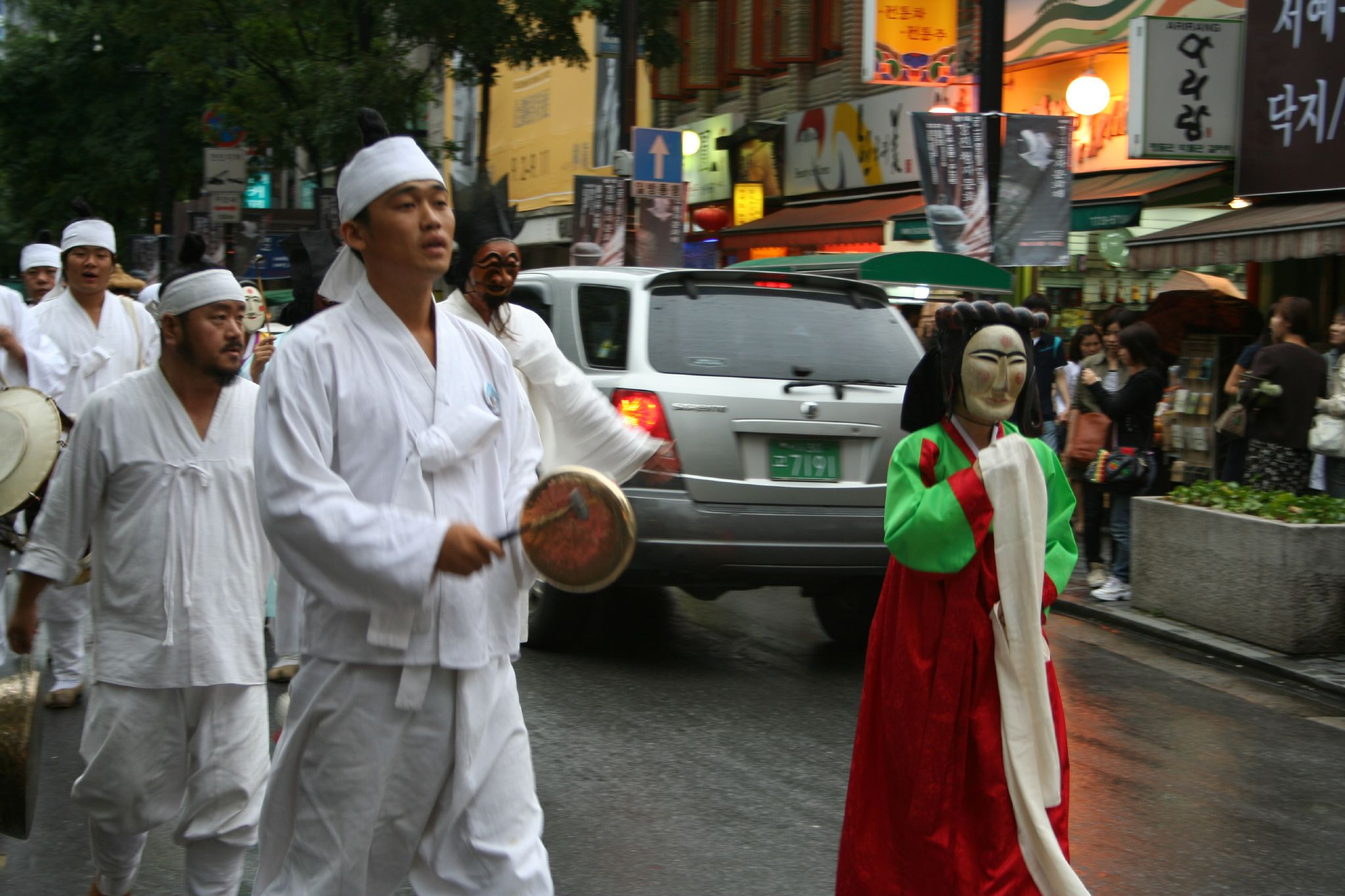

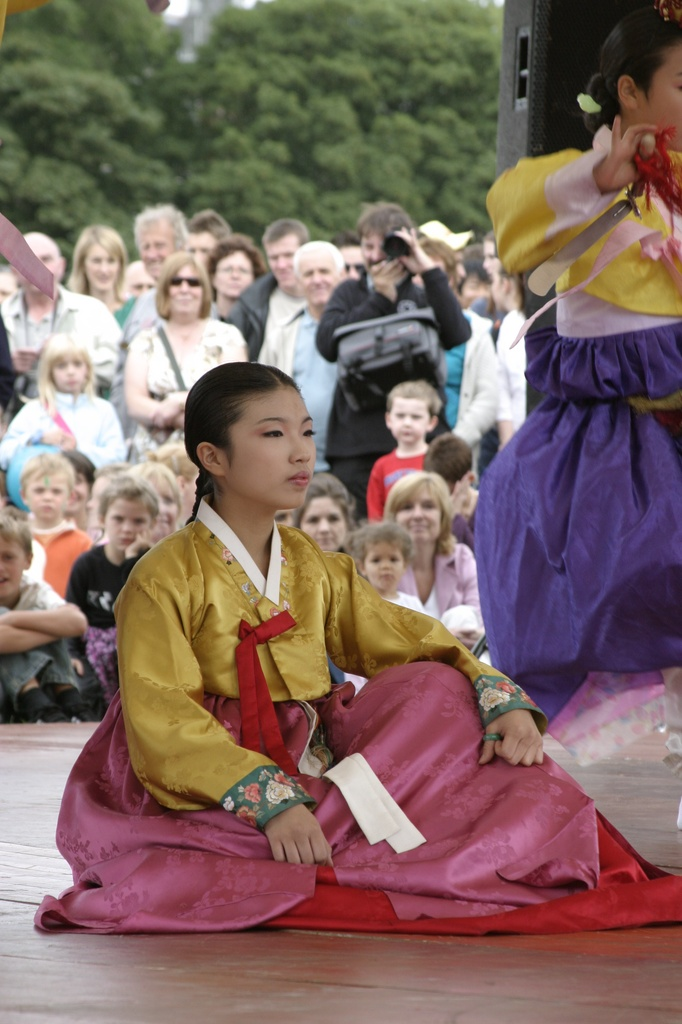

== See also ==
- Chima jeogori
- Dangui
- Dopo
- Durumagi
- Hanbok
- Jeonbok
- Po
- Sagyusam
