= Baji (clothing) =

Traditional Korean trousers

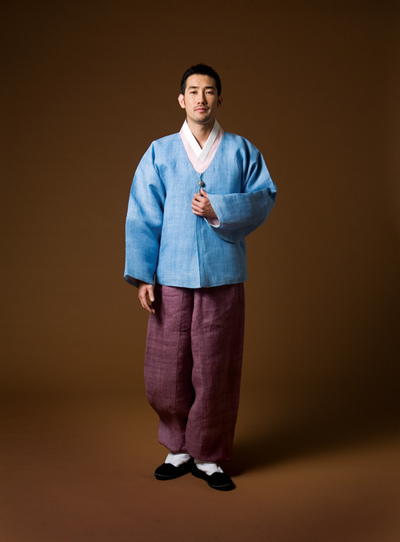
- An example of male hanbok consisting of jeogori (jacket) and baji (trousers)

Korean name
- Hangul: 바지
- RR: baji
- MR: paji

Baji (Korean: 바지) is a kind of traditional Korean pant that is part of the hanbok.

It is the term for "trousers" in Korean. It functions as modern trousers do and the term baji is commonly used in Korea to refer to every kind of pants.

A baji is baggy and loose, so it is tied around the waist. The roomy design is aimed at making the clothing ideal for sitting on the floor and an ethnic style that dates back to the Three Kingdoms period.

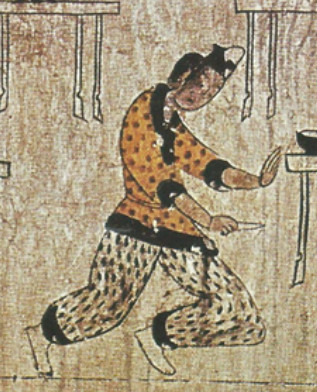
The men's Hanbok in 5th-century Goguryeo murals, rooted in northern nomadic attire, features a separate top and bottom and is worn with pants.

In the past, Korean men wore baji as outer clothing, but for women, it gradually became part of the inner clothing. Today, women wear chima for their outer clothes.
