= Cheopji =

Korean traditional hair accessory

Cheopji (Korean: 첩지; Hanja: 疊紙) is a Korean hair accessory decorating the chignon of ladies. Functional features of cheopji was to display social status based on materials used, and to hold jokduri in place when wearing a ceremonial dress. It is usually made of silver, and a frog-shape is its common form. The use of cheopji began after Baljaegaeheok (발제개혁; 髮制改革; a reformation that prohibited gache hair style, then promoted chignon hair style) proclaimed by Yeongjo of Joseon. It was used routinely at court, but ordinary people were to use this only when they wear a ceremonial dress.

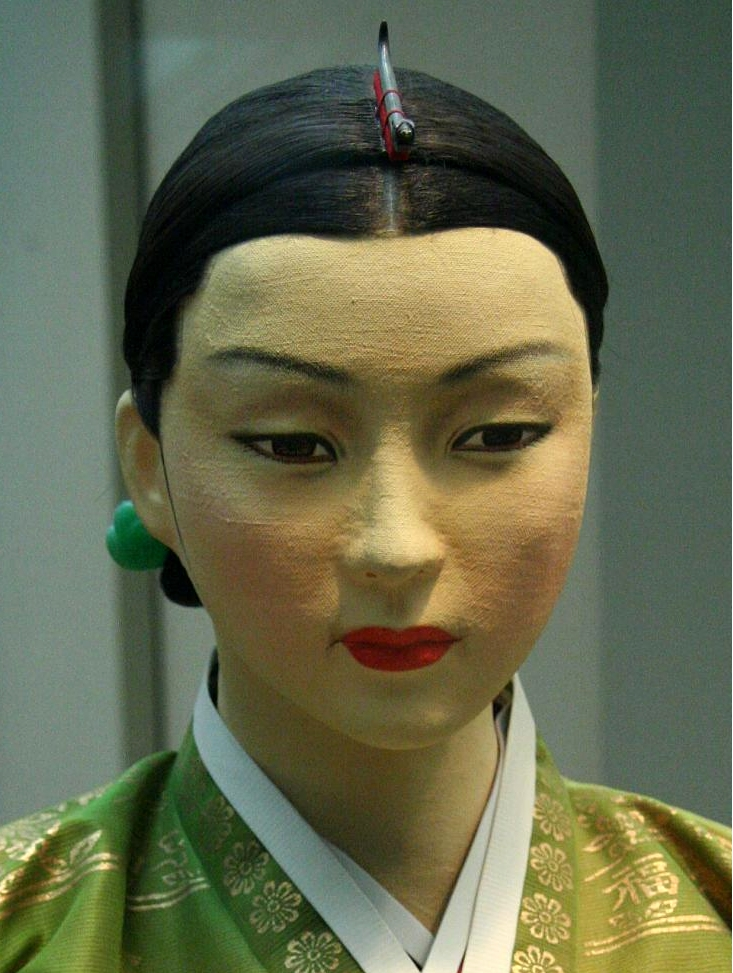
Korean hair pin-Cheopji-01

== See also ==
- Hwagwan
- Daenggi
