= Dwikkoji =

Traditional Korean hair ornament

Dwikkoji (Korean: 뒤꽂이; lit. 'pinned-in-back') is a Korean traditional ornament used to decorate ladies' chignons, and it has a sharp end. When ladies stick the dwikkoji in their chignon, it functions as jewelry adorning their hair.

Three-leg golden dwikkojis are presumed to have come from the Baekje period of Korea, and they are believed to be the origin of dwikkojis in general.

The different types of dwikkojis correspond to social status: some are for royalty, others for nobility and others are for ordinary people. The most common dwikkojis for ordinary people are called bichigae (빗치개, comb-type) and guiigae (귀이개, earpick). They are usually made of silver, and they both have elements of fanciness and practicality.

== See also ==
- Binyeo
- Gache
- Jokduri
- Daenggi
