= Diyi =

Chinese ceremonial attire for empresses and crown princess

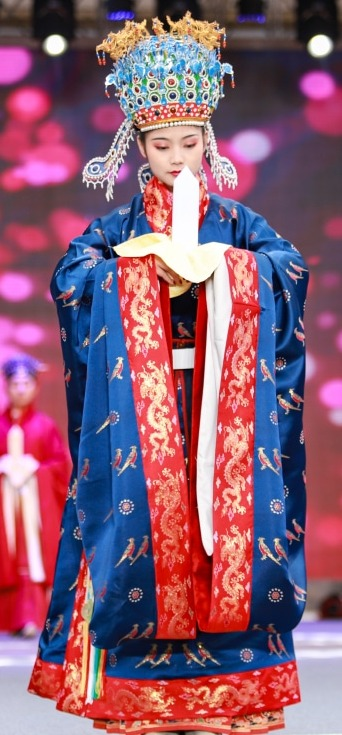
- Diyi worn with the fengguan

Chinese name
- Chinese: 翟衣
- Literal meaning: Pheasant garment
Transcriptions
Standard Mandarin
- Hanyu Pinyin: Díyī

Huiyi
- Chinese: 袆衣
- Traditional Chinese: 褘衣
Transcriptions
Standard Mandarin
- Hanyu Pinyin: Huīyī

Korean name
- Hangul: 적의
- Hanja: 翟衣
Transcriptions
- Revised Romanization: Jeogui

Diyi (Chinese: 翟衣; lit. 'pheasant garment'; Korean: 적의; Hanja: 翟衣), also known as huiyi (袆衣; 褘衣) and miaofu (庙服), is the historical Chinese attire worn by the empresses of the Song dynasty and by the empresses and crown princesses (wife of crown prince) in the Ming Dynasty. The diyi also had different names based on its colour, such as yudi (indigo), quedi (red), and weidi (black). It is a formal wear meant only for ceremonial purposes. It is a form of shenyi (深衣), and is embroidered with long-tail pheasants (翟; dí or 褘; hui) and circular flowers (小輪花; xiǎolúnhuā). It is worn with guan known as a fengguan ('phoenix crown'), typically characterized by the absence of dangling string of pearls by the sides. It was first recorded under the name huiyi in the Zhou dynasty.

== Terminology and forms ==
The diyi has been worn by empresses and other royal noblewomen since the Zhou dynasty. Since the Zhou dynasty, the diyi continued to be worn in the Northern and Southern dynasties, Sui, Tang, Song, Ming dynasties under various names: huiyi in Zhou and Song dynasty, and miaofu in Han dynasty.

Diyi also had several forms, such as yudi (褕翟) which were dyed in indigo (青; qing); quedi (闕翟; 'pheasant garments') which were dyed in red; and weidi (褘翟) which were dyed in black. They were all forms of ritual clothing worn by royal women during ceremonies.

== Cultural significance and symbolism ==
The diyi follows the traditional Confucian standard system for dressing, which is embodied in its form through the shenyi system. The garment known as shenyi is itself the most orthodox style of clothing in traditional Chinese Confucianism; its usage of the concept of five colours, and the use of di-pheasant bird pattern.

=== Pheasant pattern ===
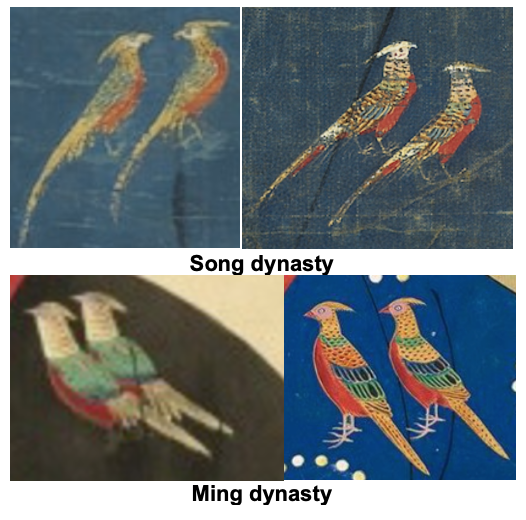
Pair of huachong motif are known as yaohui; illustration from the diyi (huiyi) of the Song and Ming dynasties

The di-bird pattern forms part of the Twelve Ornaments and is referred to as huachong (华虫; 華蟲). The pattern of paired pheasant on the diyi is called yaohui. The di-bird pattern is symbolism for "brilliance"; and the bird itself is a type of divine birds of five colours which represents the Empress' virtue. These five colours (i.e. blue, red, black, yellow, white) also correspond to the five elements; and thus, the usage of di-bird pattern aligns with the traditional colour concept in Confucianism.

=== Small circular flowers ===
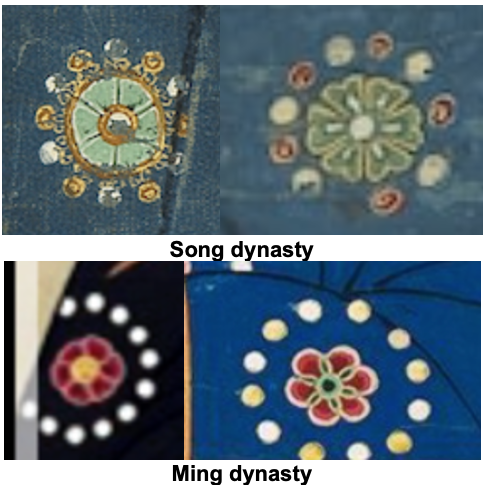
Xiaolunhua motif from the diyi of the Song and Ming dynasties

The small circular flowers known as xiaolunhua (小輪花), also known as falunhua (法轮花), which originated from the Buddhism's Rotating King and from the era of the Maurya dynasty. They are placed between each pair of di-bird pattern on the robe. The little flowers looks like a small wheel-shaped flower.

=== Shenyi system ===
The use of shenyi for women does not only represent its wearer's noble status but also represents the standard of being faithful to her spouse undo death. The shenyi was the most appropriate ceremonial clothing style of clothing for the Empress due to its symbolic meaning: it represented the harmony between Heaven, earth, and space. The shenyi consists of an upper garment and a lower garment which represents the concept of Heaven and Earth (两仪; Liangyi); the upper garment is made of 4 panels of fabric representing the four seasons, and the lower garment is made of 12 panels of fabric which represents the time of the year. The wide cuff sleeves are round-shaped to symbolize the sky and the Confucian's scholars' deep knowledge and integration while the right-angled collar is square shaped to represents the earth warning Confucians that they should have integrity and kindness; together, the sleeves and the right-angled collar represents space as the circle and the square of the world. The back of the shenyi is composed of two fabrics which are vertically sewed together and the large waist belt represents the privileged classes and is a symbolism for uprightness and honesty; it also meant fairness held by those with power.

== History ==
=== Zhou dynasty ===
The huiyi is an ancient system which was first recorded in the Zhou dynasty (c. 1046 BC – 256 BC). It was first recorded and codified in the Rites of Zhou (周礼; Zhouli). Huiyi was the highest of the empresses' six occasional outfits (liufu). The huiyi in Zhou dynasty was worn by the Empress as ceremonial clothing to pay respect during the ancestral shrine sacrifice which was the most important sacrificial event in which they could participate in. Following the Zhou dynasty, the subsequent dynasties perceived the huiyi as the highest form of ceremonial clothing. According to the Zhou dynasty rites, there were two types of black and blue clothing; however, there is currently no proof that the huiyi in the Zhou dynasty was black in colour.

=== Sui and Tang dynasty ===
The huiyi in Sui and Tang dynasties was also blue in colour.

=== Song dynasty ===
In the Song dynasty, the huiyi was the highest form of ceremonial clothing worn by the Empress; it was worn on important ceremonial occasions such as wedding, coronations, when holding court, and during ancestral shrine sacrifices. The Huiyi was made out of dark blue zhicheng (a kind of woven fabric). When empress wears the huiyi, she also needs to wear a phoenix crown, a blue inner garment and a dark blue bixi lap covering, with blue socks and shoes, along with a pair of jade pendants and other jade ornaments.

Early Song dynasty sanlitu (三礼图) illustrations of the huiyi show it as a form of shenyi (深衣), being deep blue and is decorated with di bird patterns.

In the Records of Chariots and Horses and Clothes written in the Yuan dynasty, the Song dynasty huiyi is described as being dark blue in colour and there are 12 lines of di birds which stand together in pair. There is a bixi which hangs in the central region of the front skirt; the colour of bixi has the same colour as the bottom of the lower skirt. Di bird patterns can decorate the black, red collar edge in 3 lines. There is also a belt which is divided into a large belt made of silk (which is dark blue in with red lining with the upper surface part made of red brocade while the lower part made of green brocade) and narrow leather belt (which is cyan in colour decorated with white jade in pairs) is on top of the large silk belt. The socks are dark blue in colour; the shoes are also dark blue but decorated with gold ornaments.

The literature which describes the Song dynasty huiyi however does not always provide details (e.g. variations) which can be found in the Song dynasty court painting and some discrepancies can be found between the text and the paintings. From the several court portrait paintings of the Song dynasty, it is found that the huiyi was cross-collar closing to the right, with large and wide sleeves, and with cloud and dragons patterns ornamenting the collar, sleeves and placket, with a belt worn around the waist; and while all the huiyi were depicted as being deep blue in colour, they differed in shades of dark blue showing variation. Instead of being in three lines as described in the Yuan dynasty's records, in the Song paintings, the di bird pattern which decorates the belts is denser.

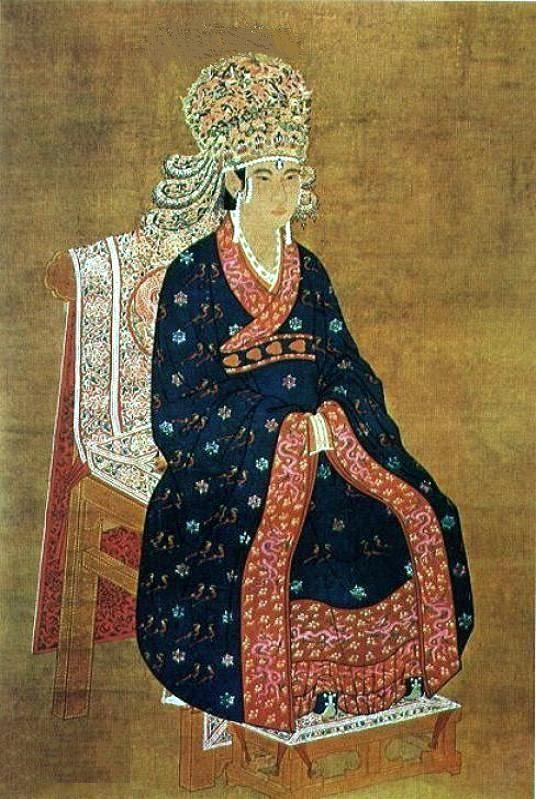
Empress of Shenzong

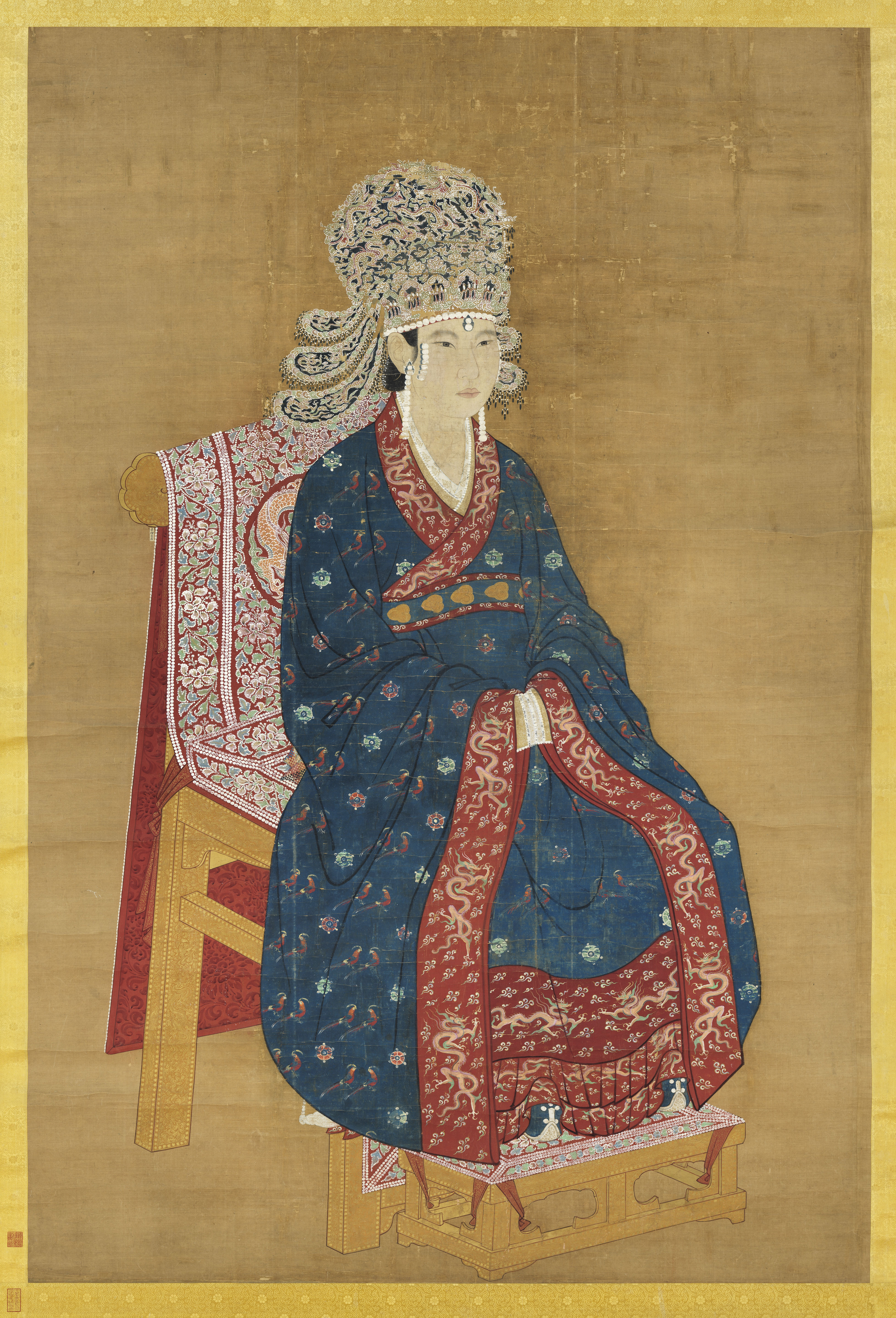
Empress Xiang

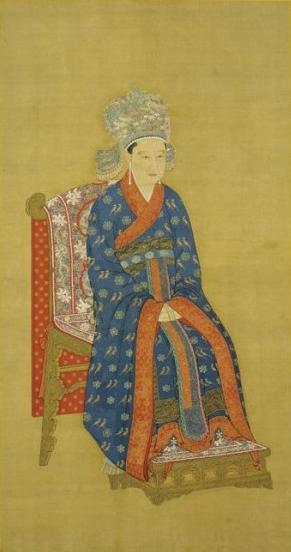
Empress of GuangZong

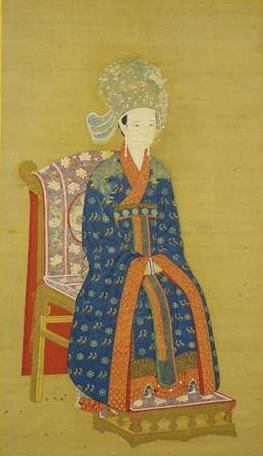
Empress of Qinzong

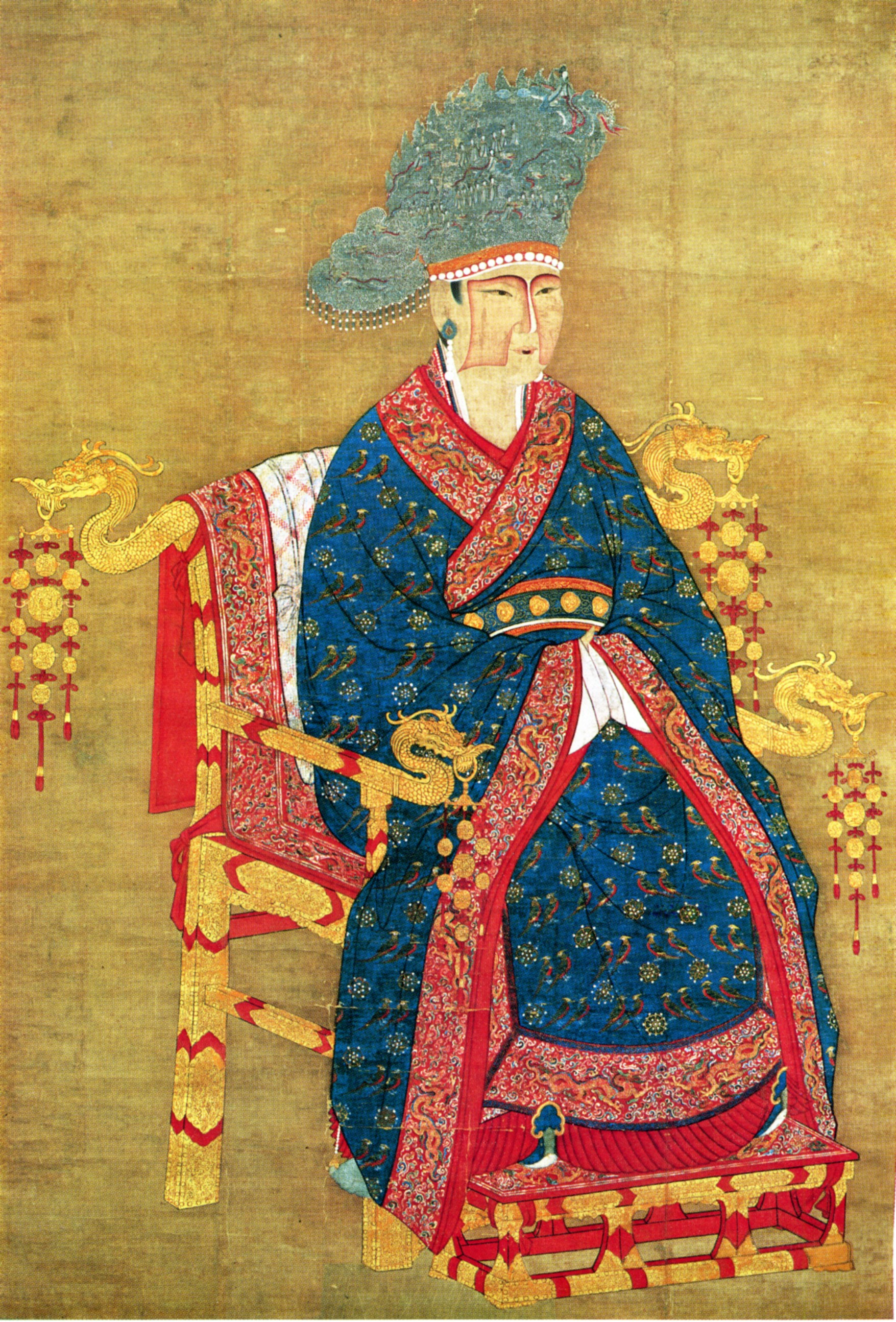
Empress of Zhenzong

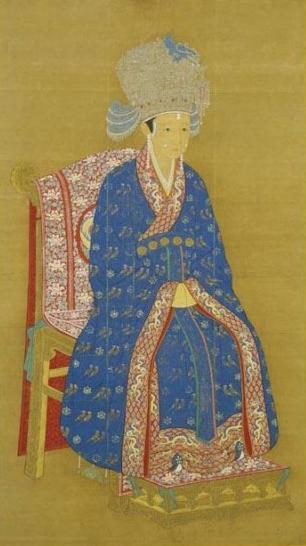
Empress of Huizong

Empress of Ningzong.

Empress of Qinzong

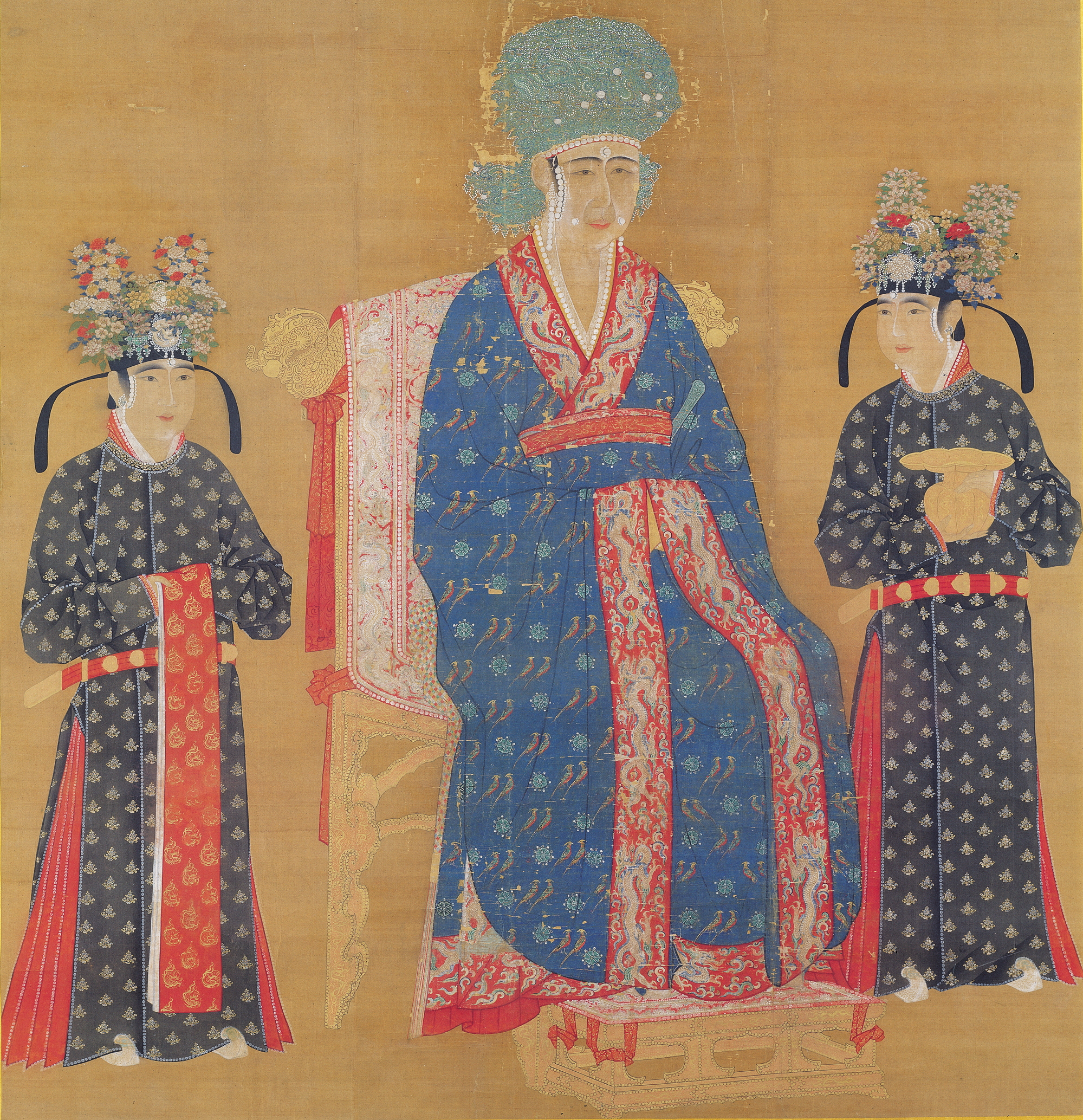
Empress of Renzong

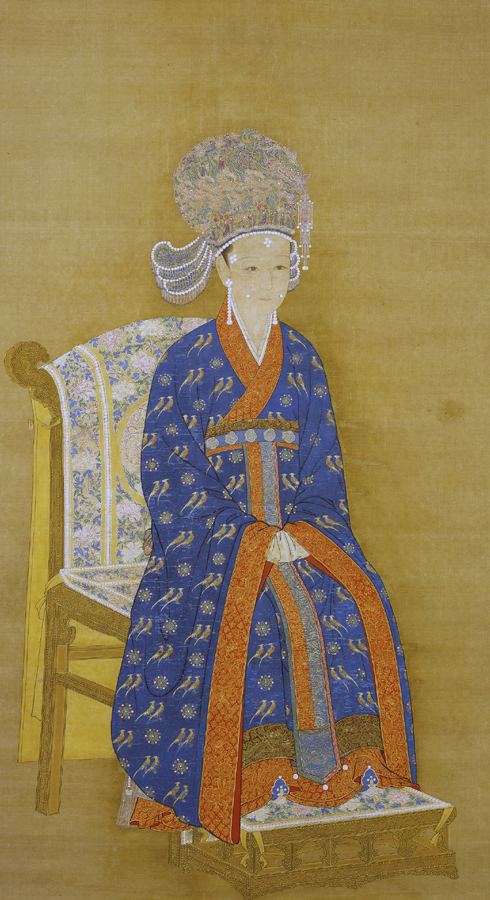
Empress of Gaozong.

=== Ming dynasty ===
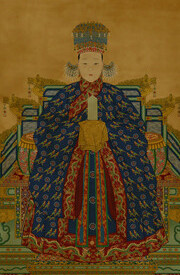
Empress wearing diyi, Ming dynasty

The Huiyi was also the ceremonial dress of the empress in the Ming dynasty. In the Ming dynasty, the huiyi was composed of the phoenix crown, the xiapei, an overdress and long-sleeved blouse. In the Ming dynasty, there were different kinds of phoenix crowns depending on the ranks of its wearer. The empresses' was decorated with 9 dragons and 4 phoenixes; imperial concubines had 9 multicoloured pheasants and 4 phoenixes; and for the titled women was a coloured coronet, which was not decorated with dragons or phoenixes but with pearls, feathers of wild fowl and flower hairpins. The quedi is dyed in red instead of blue.

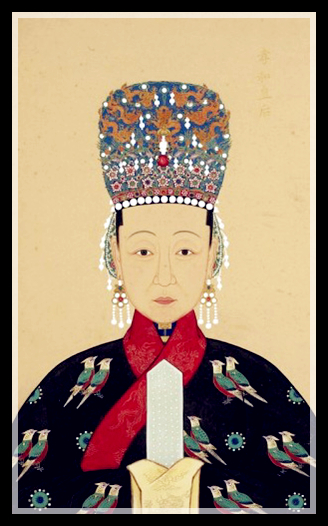
Empress Xiaohe

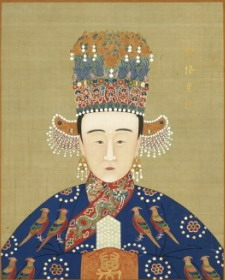
Empress Xiaoke

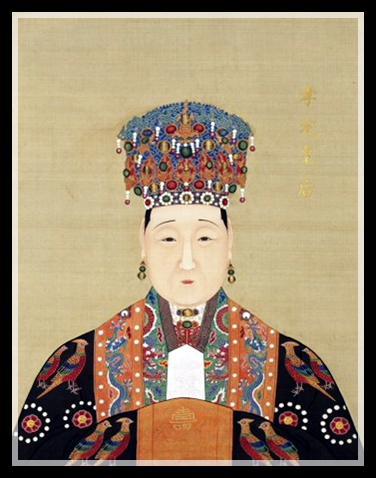
Empress Xiaoding

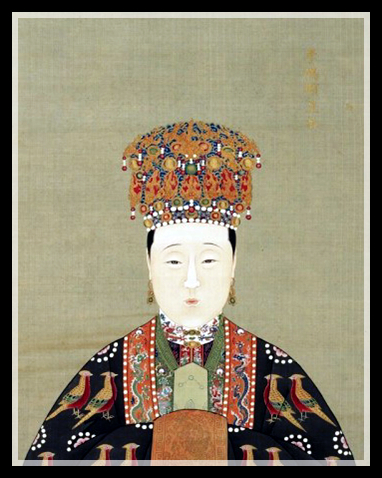
Empress Xiaoduan

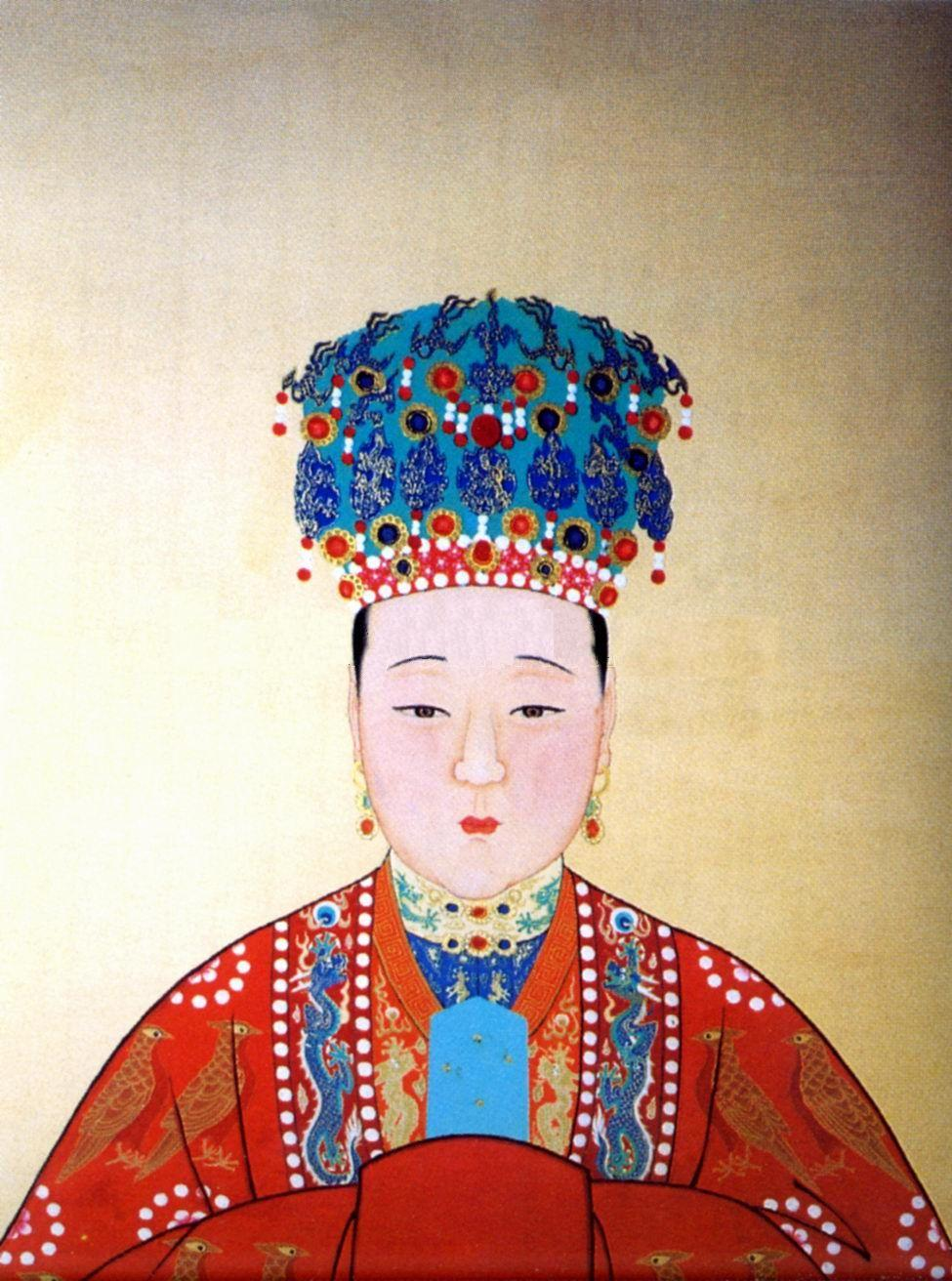
Empress xiaoduan wearing quedi.

=== Qing dynasty ===
Illustration of a woman wearing huiyi (褘衣) from the Chinese encyclopedia Gujin Tushu Jicheng, between 1700 and 1725 AD.

Illustration of huiyi (褘衣) from the Chinese encyclopedia Gujin Tushu Jicheng, between 1700 and 1725 AD.

=== Modern Restoration ===
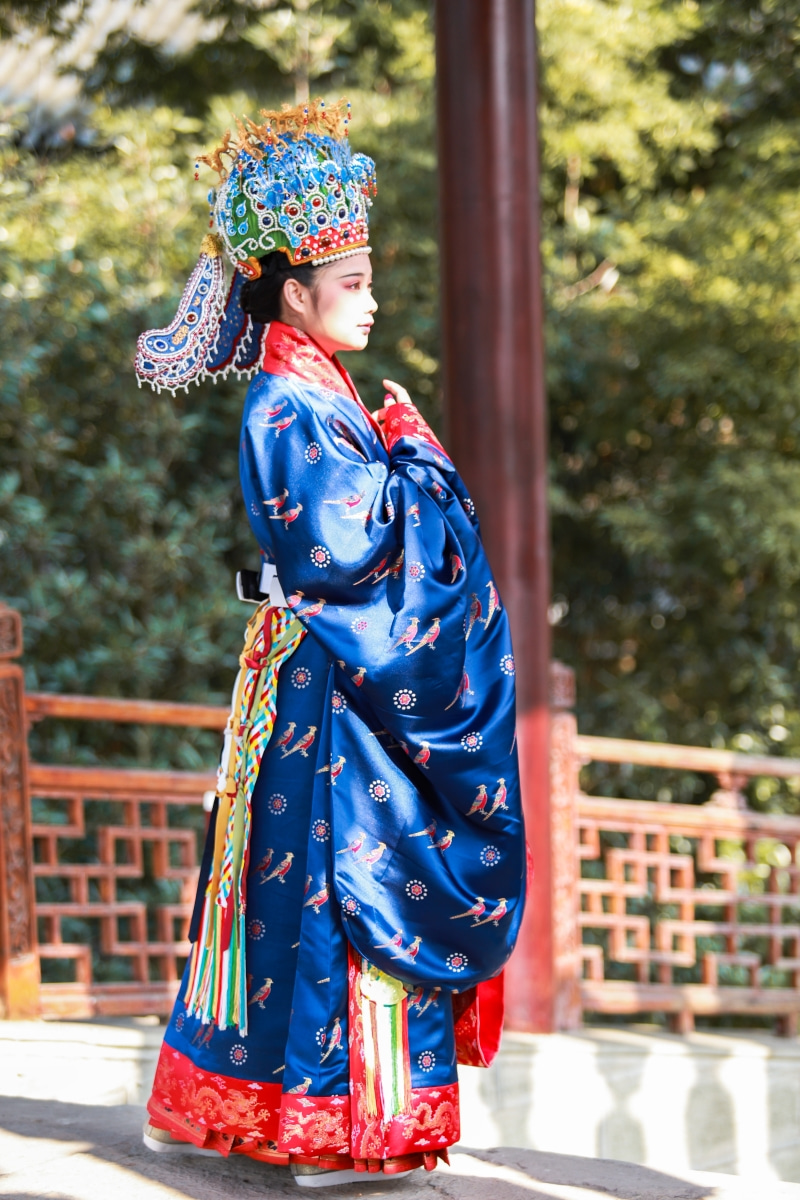
Side view of diyi

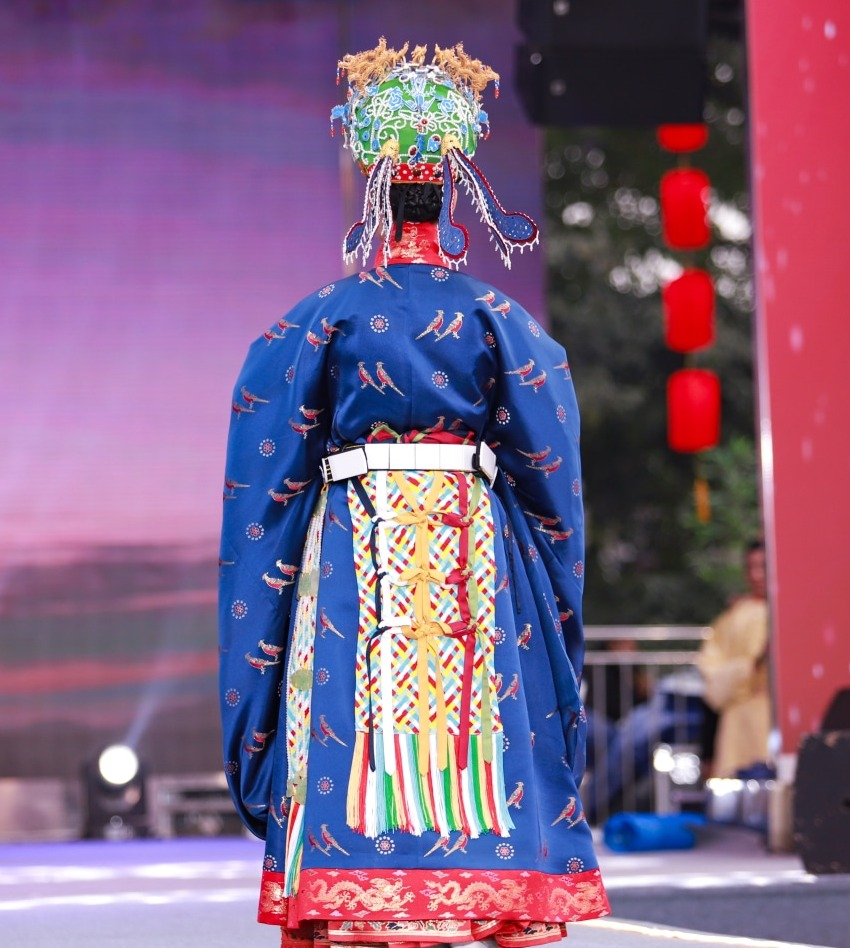
Rear view of diyi

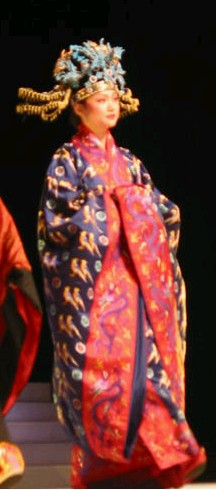
Restoration of Ming dynasty empress diyi

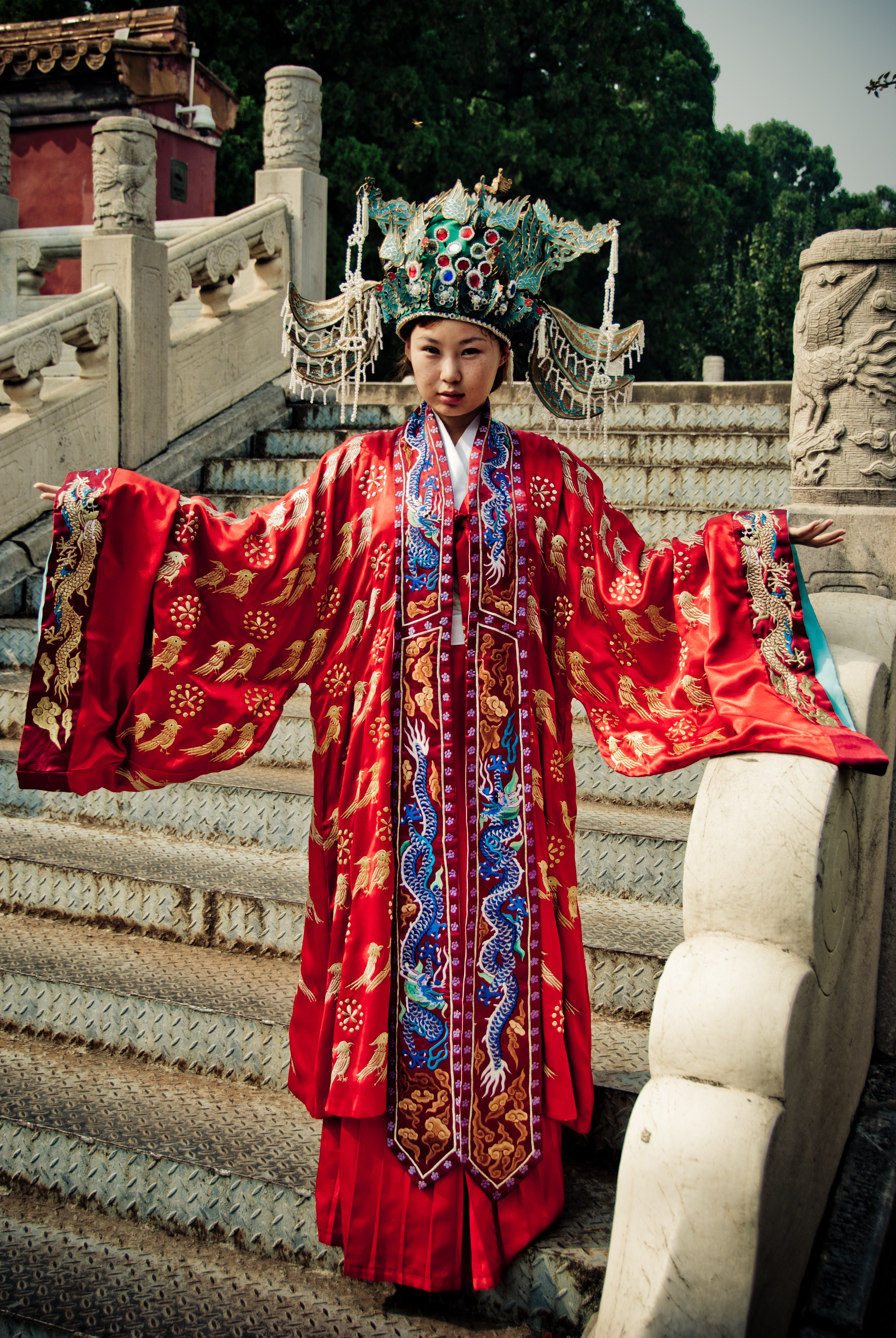
Quedi, red coloured diyi

== Influences and derivatives ==
=== Japan ===
In Japan, the features of the Tang dynasty-style huiyi was found as a textile within the formal attire of the Heian Japanese empresses.

=== Korea ===
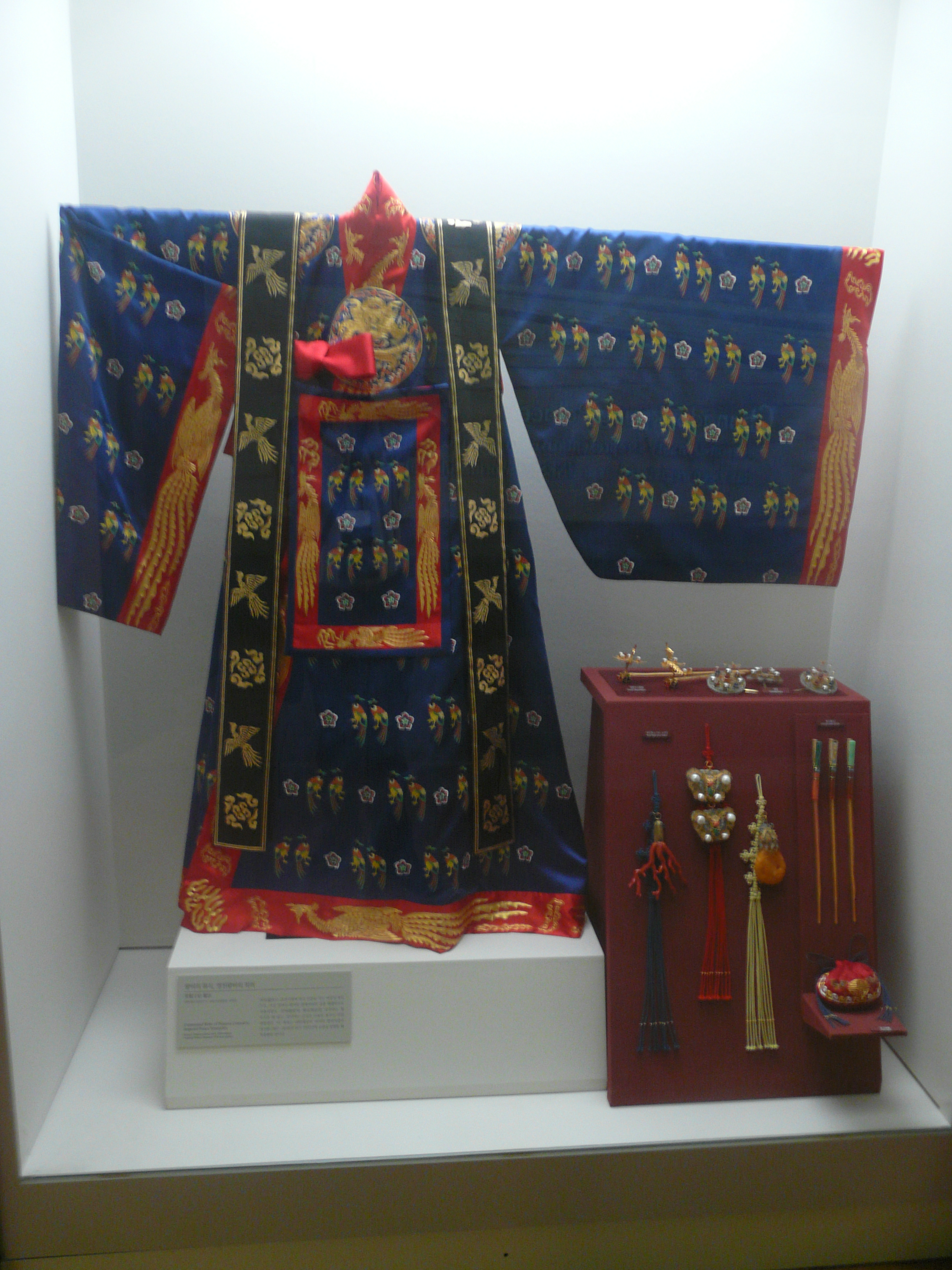
Korean jeokui.

Korean queens started to wear the jeokui (Korean: 적의; Hanja: 翟衣) in 1370 AD under the final years of Gongmin of Goryeo, when Goryeo adopted the official ceremonial attire of the Ming dynasty. In the Joseon dynasty, the official dress worn by queens was wearing the jeokui which was adopted from the Ming dynasty's diyi. The jeokui was a ceremonial robe which was worn by the Joseon queens on the most formal occasions. It was worn together with jeokgwan (적관; 翟冠) in the late Goryeo and early Joseon, hapi (하피; 霞帔), pyeseul (폐슬; 蔽膝). According to the Annals of Joseon, from 1403 to the first half of the 17th century the Ming dynasty sent a letter, which confers the queen with a title along with the following items: jeokgwan, a vest called baeja (배자; 褙子), and a hapi. However, the jeokui sent by the Ming dynasty did not correspond to those worn by the Ming empresses as Joseon was considered to be ranked two ranks lower than Ming. Instead the jeokui which was bestowed corresponded to the Ming women's whose husband held the highest government official posts. The jeokdui worn by the queen and crown princess was originally made of red silk; it then became blue in 1897 when the Joseon king and queen were elevated to the status of emperor and empress.

In early Joseon, from the reign of King Munjong to the reign of King Seonjo, the queen wore a plain red ceremonial robe with wide sleeves (대홍대삼; 大紅大衫; daehong daesam, also referred as daesam for short). The daesam is believed to be similar in form to the Ming dynasty's daxiushan, which was worn by the titled court women of the first rank. The daesam was another garment which was bestowed by the Ming dynasty from the reign of King Munjong of early Joseon to the 36th year of King Seonjo's reign in 1603; it continued to be worn even after the fall of the Ming dynasty.

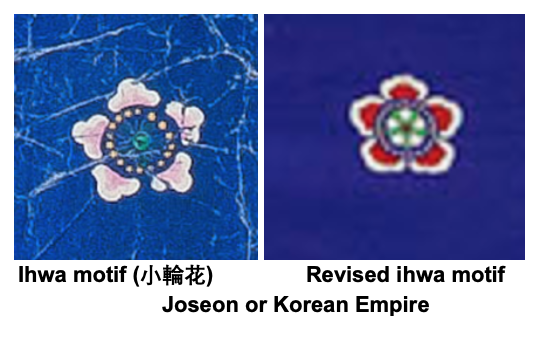
Korean ihwa motifs, Joseon or Korean Empire.

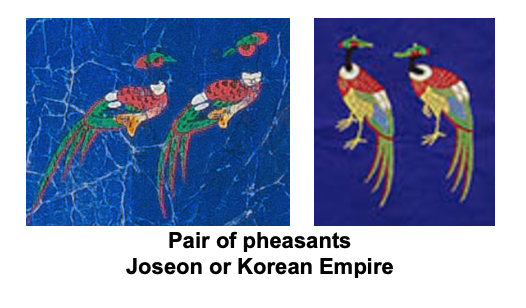
Korean pair of phesants motif, Joseon or Korean Empire.

Following the fall of the Ming dynasty, Joseon established their own jeogui system. In the late Joseon, the daesam was modified to feature pheasant heads and a rank badge. In the Korea Empire, the blue jeokui was established for the Korean Empress. The Chinese xiaolunhua (小輪花) motif is known as ihwa motif in Korea, likely designed in 1750 when Joseon established their own jeokui system. By the Korea Empire, the ihwa motif was revised and became one of the primary emblem of the Korean empire.

The jeokgwan was the Chinese crown decorated with pheasant motifs; it was worn by the queens and princesses of the Ming dynasty. The jeokgwan originated from the bonggwan (봉관; 鳳冠) which was worn from by the Chinese empresses. The jeokgwan was bestowed to Princess Noguk in late Goryeo by Empress Ma of Ming; it continued to bestowed in Joseon until the early 17th century. It stopped being bestowed after the fall of the Ming dynasty. In the late Joseon, the jeokgwan was developed into a wig called daesu which consisted with a gache and binyeo, following extensive reforms. The daesu was then worn until the end of Joseon.

2 variations of the diyi had been developed in Korea during the Joseon dynasty, and later in the Korean Empire. The developments were as follows:

- During the Joseon dynasty, the diyi was known as Chijeok-ui (치적의; 雉翟衣) or jeokui, and is characterized as a predominant red outfit with a similarity to the wonsam.
- During the Korean Empire, the chijeok-ui was later changed into the (original) blue with red trim similar to its Chinese model.

Diyi were worn by:

- Princesses Consort on their marriage to the Crown Prince and on major ceremonies (대례복; 大禮服; daeryebok).
- Queens Consort on their coronation ceremony and on major ceremonies (대례복; 大禮服; daeryebok).
- The King's subsequent Queens Consort on their marriage to the King.
- It was also worn by the queens and princesses when they visited the Royal Ancestors Shrine and when they were receiving morning visits from their retainers.
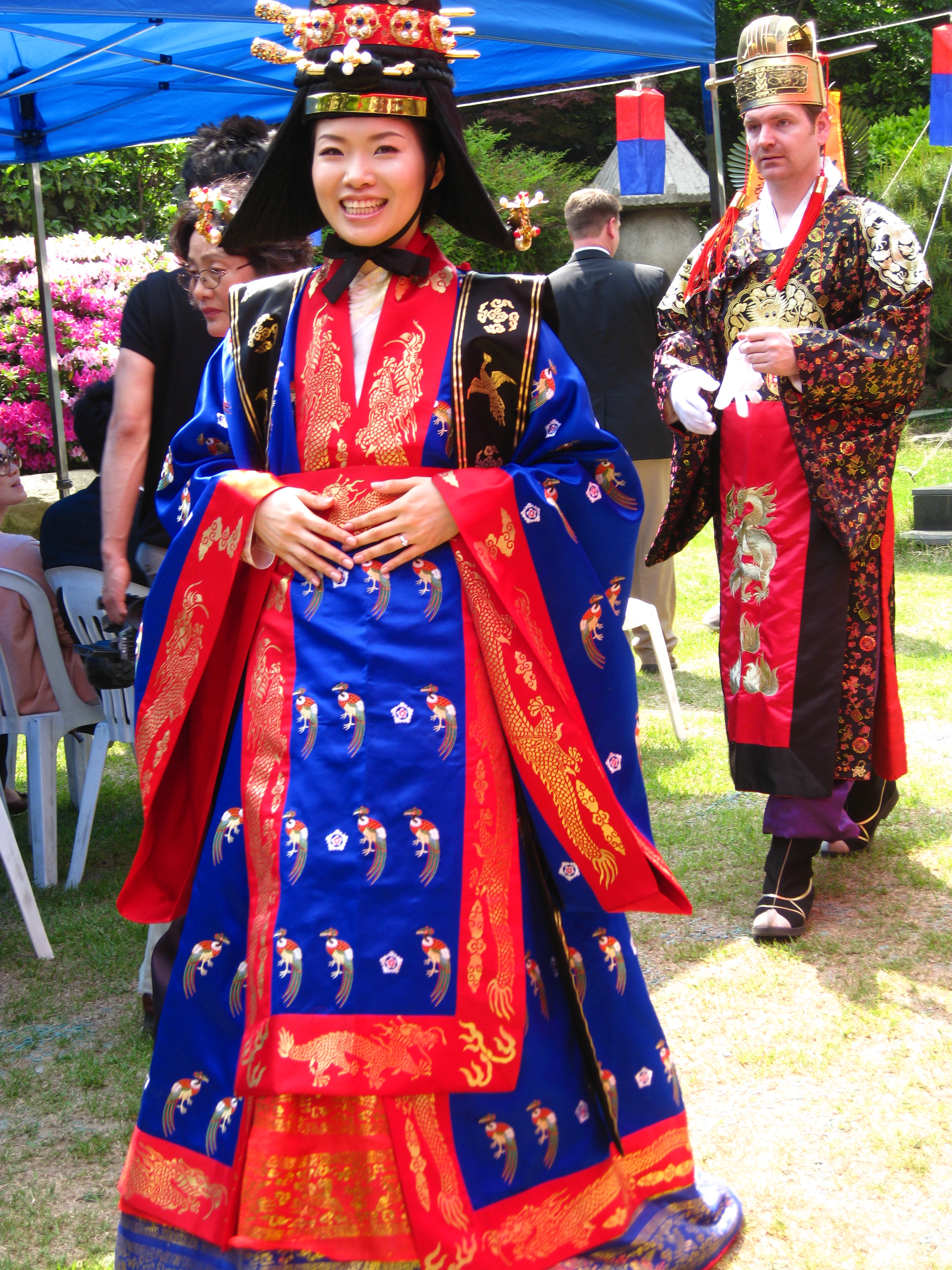
Restoration of Korean queen's jeogui and daesu

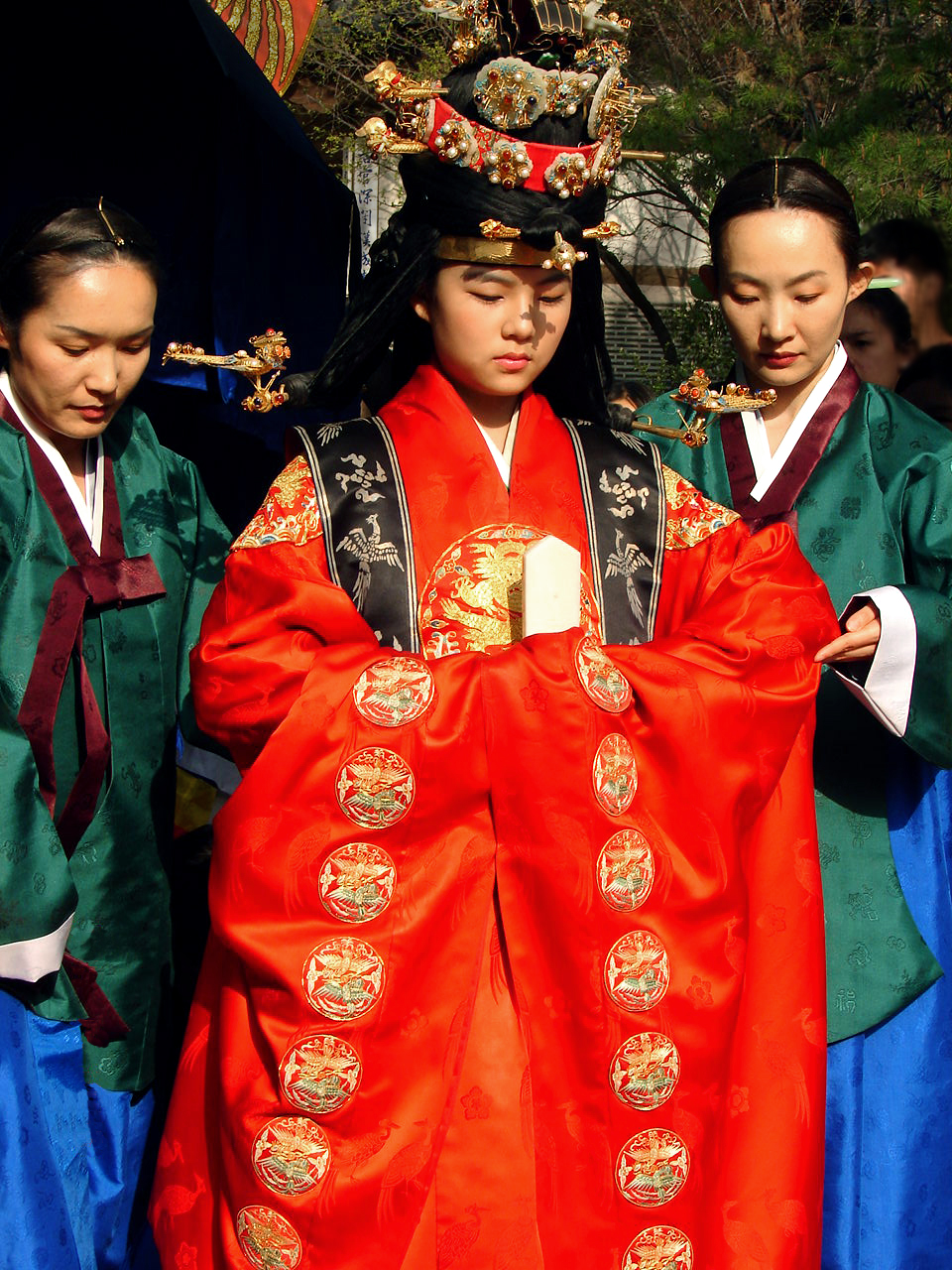
Chijeok-ui (赤翟衣)

=== Vietnam ===
The diyi (Sino-Vietnamese: Địch Y; 翟衣) was called Huy Địch (褘翟) in Vietnam and was recorded in the book Tang thương ngẫu lục 桑滄偶錄. The diyi might have historically been worn by the Vietnamese empress in Vietnam:

粵考成周之遺制、宜加太妃之新封、于以彰保佑之功、于以盡哀榮之禮。於戲，褘翟命服，流輝無間其存亡，馬鬣漏泉、賁飭有光於溟漠。

Việt khảo Thành Chu chi di chế, nghi gia Thái phi chi tân phong, vu dĩ chương bảo hựu chi công, vu dĩ tận ai vinh chi lễ, ư hi huy địch mệnh phục, lưu huy vô gián kỳ tồn vong mã liệp lậu tuyền, bí sức hữu quang ư minh mạc.

Vậy xét theo phép của nhà Thành Chu, tôn phong bà làm bực Thái phi, để tỏ công phù trì, để hợp lễ thương kính. Than ôi, áo xiêm Vi Địch dâng tiến, vinh quang chẳng cứ khi mất còn; nấm đất vun bồi, rực rỡ đến tận cõi minh mạc.

Following Zhōu dynasty’s rites to honour the new Grand Concubine’s coronation, in order to display the utmost appreciation of her services and to perfect the great ceremony. As for Huy Địch dress, the shining glories stay in the fine-grained texture, and this shall be continuously succeeded. The imperial cemetery and bureaucracy, could glow even in the most remote and darkest of places.

== See also ==
- Hanfu
- List of Hanfu
- Shenyi
- Chinese auspicious ornaments in textile and clothing
