= Hwarot =

Ceremonial Korean women's clothing

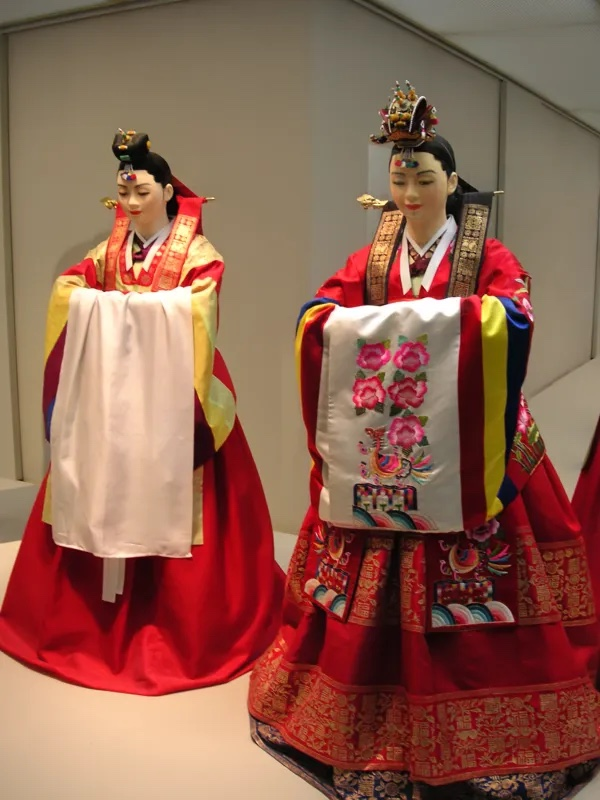

Korean name
- Hangul: 활옷
- RR: hwarot
- MR: hwarot

Hwarot (Korean: 활옷) is a type of traditional Korean clothing worn during the Goryeo and Joseon eras only by royal women for ceremonial occasions and later by commoners for weddings. It is still worn during the pyebaek phase of modern weddings. Before commoners wore hwarots, they wore wonsam due to the steep cost of a hwarot. The gown is typically worn with a jokduri or hwagwan, binyeo or daenggi, and yeongigonji, which is red and black makeup spots on the cheek and brow.

== Origins and development ==
The Hwarot worn in Joseon may have been derived from Chinese-style clothing, with its earliest influence from the ceremonial court clothing and upper class clothing of the Tang dynasty. Another hypothesis is that the hwarot worn in Joseon may also be linked to the Goryeo queens' 'big red coat' (taehong'ui) which was not allowed to be worn by commoners.

== Design and construction ==
The hwarot is an elaborately embroidered long robe with long and wide sleeves to cover the wearer's hands. It is pieced together using many panels, has long side slits, and is similar to the hanbok. The difference between a hwarot and a hanbok is the straight and symmetrical lines of the hwarot compared to the undergarments and that it closes in the front compared to other Asian garments that clasp at the right side. Typical hwarots have a red exterior and a blue interior to symbolize the yin and yang relationship between the husband and bride. The sleeves have three silk strips of red, blue, and yellow with a white cuff. The robe is often decorated with symbols thought to bring wealth, good fortune, and fertility to the new couple. Some common motifs included in the embroidery are flowers, plants, birds, and animal pairs meant to represent the bridal couple. The hwarot embroidery would also often contain characters. Due to the simple and unfitted style, some villages would have a few communal gowns that families would borrow for weddings.

The hwarot is expensive to make so a single gown would be passed down for several generations. Due to years of use, many repairs would need to be made such as using patches of embroidery cut from other gowns. Hair ribbons were also used as a textile to repair the worn out areas, such as the fold line of the shoulder. Trimming was a common repair method, particularly for the outlines of the body panels and sleeves that were damaged more easily. A common way to preserve the dress over generations was to cover the cuffs and collar with soft paper that was replaced after each wedding. Due to the heavy embroidery, several layers of backing paper were needed in the robes. The extra layers were difficult to sew through, so appliques were a standard method of repairs as well. For small repairs, they occasionally used bold colors of green, purple and sky blue instead of a red thread that would blend in. While repairing the robe for each wedding, family members would include additional motifs to symbolize their own well-wishes for the bride.

== Gallery ==
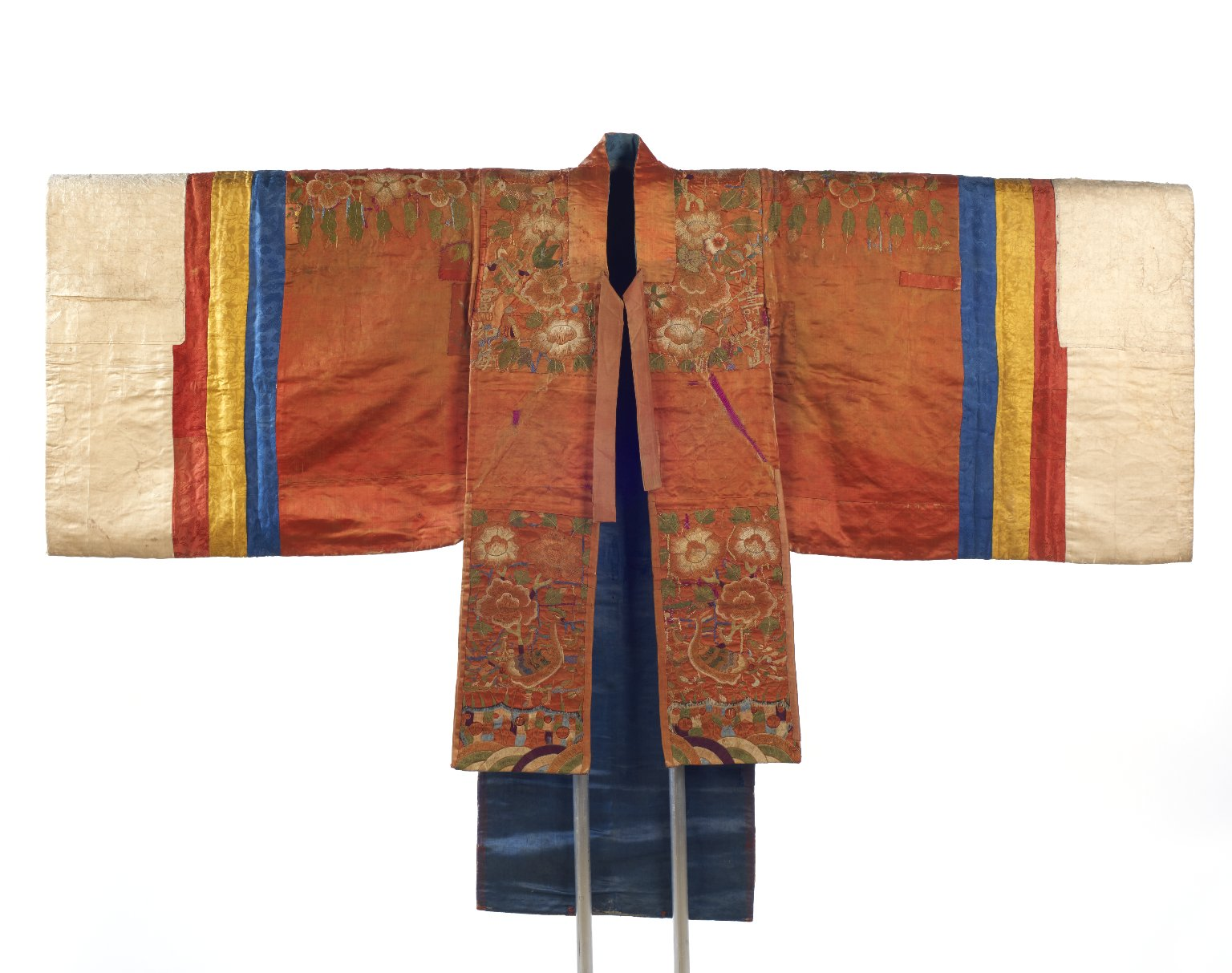
Bride's Robe (Hwarot).

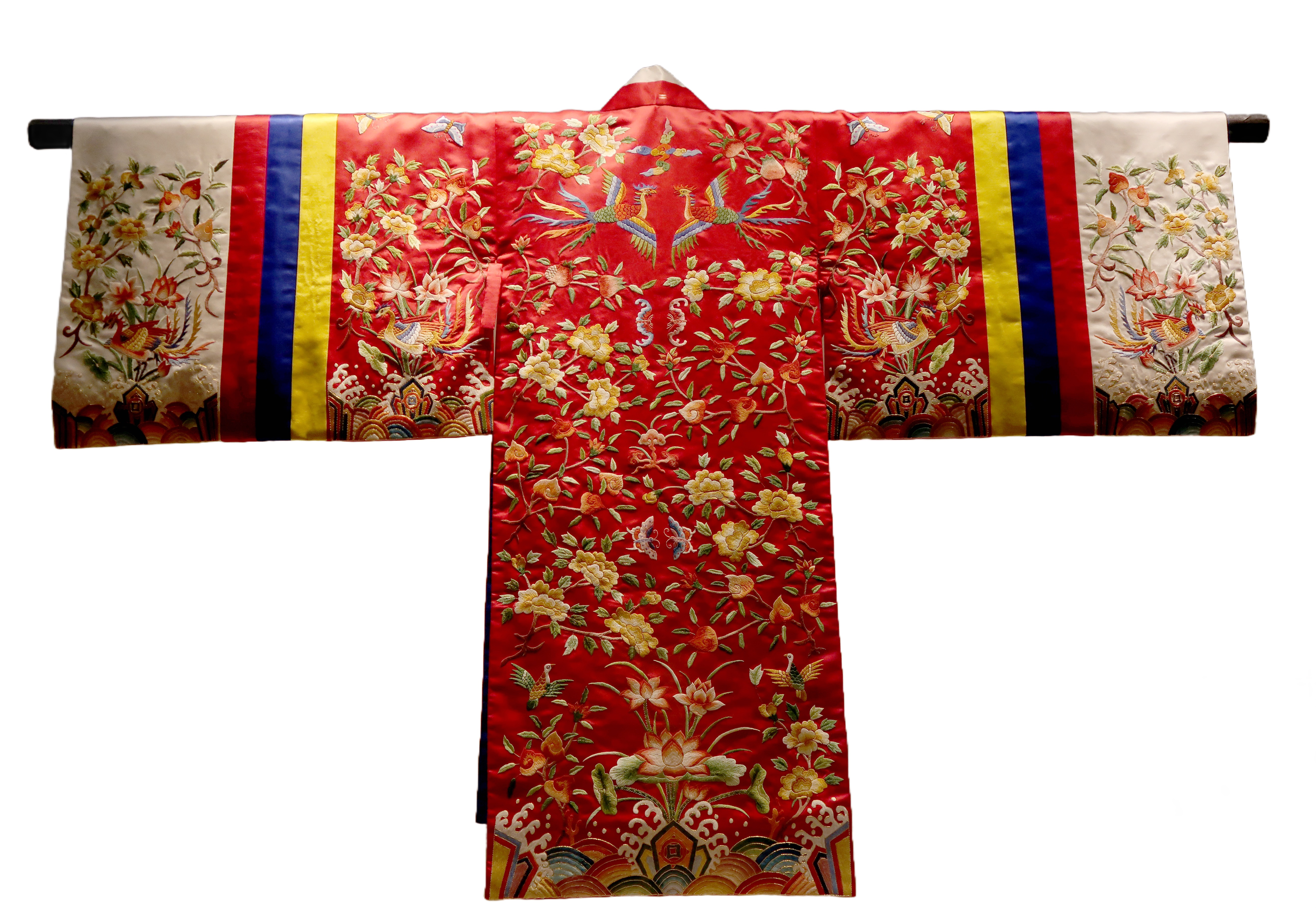
Hwarot, Joseon Dynasty, 19th c (rear view)

== See also ==
- Gache
- Hanbok
- Hwagwan
- Jokduri
