= Binyeo =

Korean traditional hairpin

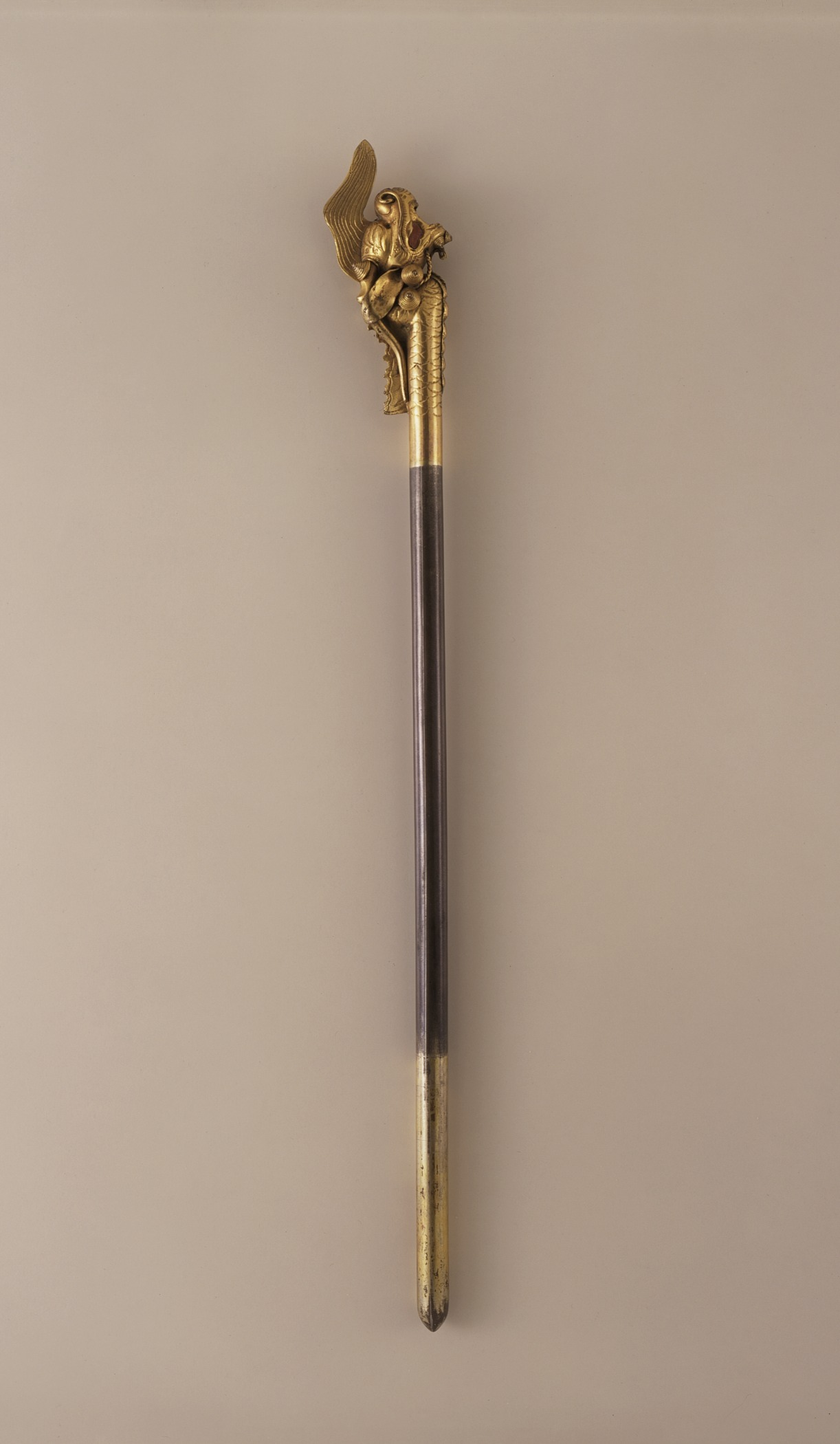
Binyeo with dragon head

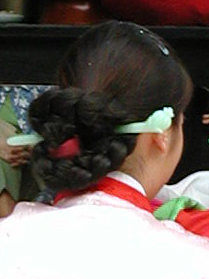
Binyeo

A binyeo (Korean: 비녀; Korean pronunciation: [pi.njʌ̜]) is a Korean traditional hairpin for fixing ladies' chignons. Its main purpose is to pin the chignon in place, but it also serves as ornamentation, and it has different usages or names according to its material or shape. Therefore, it is possible to identify one's social status by looking at their binyeo. Binyeo are divided into two kinds, a jam (잠; 簪; Korean pronunciation: [tɕam]) and a chae (채; 釵 Korean pronunciation: [tɕʰɛ̝]). Jam have a long body and chae have an upturned 'U' shape. Binyeo are usually used by women, but they are also used by men to fix their sangtu (topknots) in place.

In the Joseon Dynasty, on the day of becoming an adult, girls held a coming of age ceremony by putting binyeo in their hair. In the ascension myth "Chiwondae Yangsanbok", which is passed down in the Hamgyeong-do area, it also appears as a medium for binyeo to meet the two loved ones.

== Origin ==
Binyeo (originally 빈혀 where 鬢 is the first character), according to historical records, are traced back to use during the Three Kingdoms Era, usually worn with a Goryeo ladies' hair style similar to chignons. Details surrounding the use of the binyeo became more detailed since King Yeongjo of the Joseon Dynasty (Huidrom). It is said that King Yeongjo may have forced women to put on binyeo. During the Silla dynasty, it is noted that a ban was created in order to pursue frugality amongst the people (Yi, 2006, p. 202). The binyeo was used as a replacement for the gachae also known as a wig, that many married women would put around their hair to show status and standing in society. Due to the extent and weight of some of these pieces, women would suffer injuries to their necks. In order to prevent further social problems from arising due to the excessive costs of the items and to prevent further injuries, the gachae was replaced with the binyeo.

The main purpose of the binyeo is to affix women's hair as well as serve as an ornament to accessories. Binyeo come in two types: one is used to pin the woman's hair into place, and the other is used to place hwagwan and jokduri types of flower cornets in place (National Folk Museum of Korea). Those that were used to just pin women's hair were known by different names, all of which were dependent on the type of materials they were made of as well as the shape of the pin (known as Jamdu; National Folk Museum of Korea). There were also binyeo that served different uses, such as formal purposes, daily wear, seasonal as well as ones worn based on age.

== Cultural significance ==
Prior to the Joseon era men also wore binyeo. They were often used to secure their topknots before the rigid dichotomies of Confucianism and Buddhism interfered (Rowan, 2019). However, during the Joseon Dynasty under the influence of Confucianism, women's clothing was limited to some extent, and ordinary people, not the upper class, could only wear wedding clothes (Shin, M., & Park, S., 2014). Regulations were inherited based on the certain class of individuals on who could wear or make different ornaments and accessories from the previous Goryeo Dynasty. It is said that "the use of gold and silver was restricted during the Joseon Dynasty, and the simplicity and sophistication of ornaments stood out even more" (Shin, M., & Park, S., 2014).

During the Joseon era women would wear a variety of different hair accessories and ornaments on their heads to decorate their clothing. At this time women's hairstyles reflected their social status as well as their marital status. The binyeo was also considered as a symbol of being a married woman. Often given as a gift from their husband or suitor. At the gyerye rite, a part of the coming-of-age ceremony, many girls would first wear and display this specific type of hair pin. The binyeo which was not to be removed also played a significant role in the passing of a girl/woman's parents. Some would remove the binyeo and allow their hair to fall in order to repent for their belief that they caused their parents demise. After three days they would fix their hair back in a chignon and replace their binyeo with one made of wood. This wood binyeo is to be worn for three years of mourning (National Folk Museum of Korea). This was a way to show their discretion and consideration to not be seen as short sighted.

== See also ==
- Chinese hairpin – a Chinese equivalent
- Daenggi
- Gache
- Jokduri
- Kanzashi – a Japanese equivalent
