= Cockernonnie =

Former Scottish woman's hairstyle

A cockernonnie or cockernonie was an old Scottish women's hairstyle where the hair was gathered up, like the modern chignon. The fashion was popular in the mid-19th century. Scottish author Charles Mackay, in his Dictionary of Lowland Scotch, believed the word derived from the Teutonic words koker (cape) and nonne (nun), as nuns wore their hair in a covering in a similar style.

== See also ==
- List of hairstyles
