= Hwagwan =

Korean traditional hat

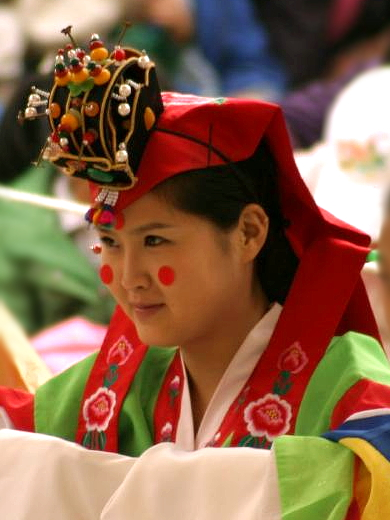
- Hwagwan worn by a bride

Korean name
- Hangul: 화관
- Hanja: 花冠
- RR: hwagwan
- MR: hwagwan

Hwagwan (Korean: 화관) is a Korean traditional style of coronet worn by women, traditionally for ceremonial occasions such as weddings. It is similar to the jokduri in shape and function, but the hwagan is more elaborate.

The hwagwan is slightly larger than 'jokduri' and served to emphasize beauty by decorating gold, bichui and pearls on cloth.

== See also ==
- Ayam
- Gache
- Hanbok
- Hwarot
