= Daenggi =

Traditional Korean ribbon worn in women's hairstyles

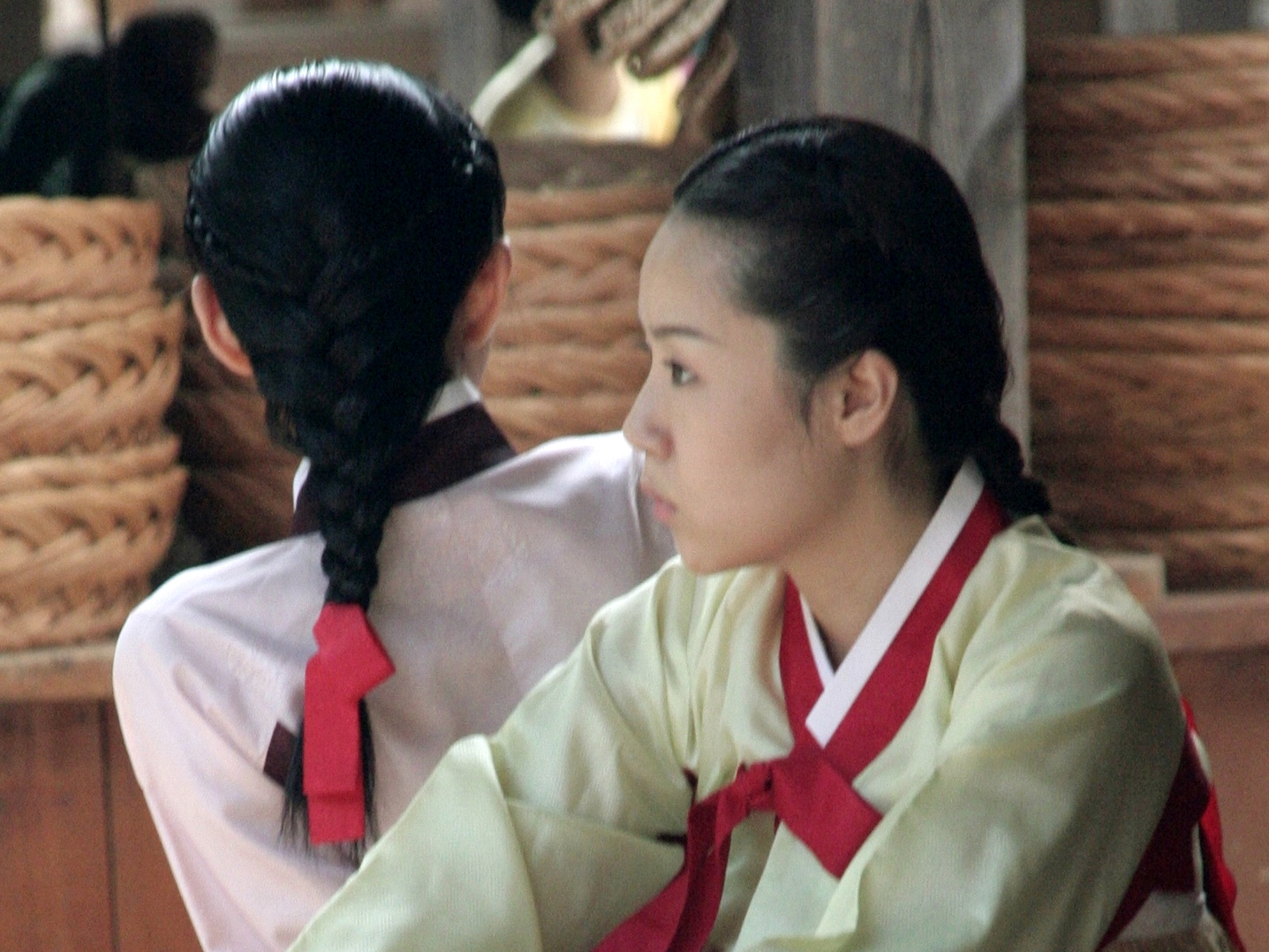
- Jebiburi daenggi

Korean name
- Hangul: 댕기
- RR: daenggi
- MR: taenggi

A daenggi (Korean: 댕기) is a traditional Korean ribbon used to tie up and decorate braided hair. According to the History of Northern Dynasties, maidens of Baekje bound their hair at the back and braided it, while a married woman braided her hair into two plaits and secured them to the crown of her head.

There are several types of daenggi according to purpose, age, and social status. Tteoguji daenggi, maegae daenggi, doturak daenggi and deurim daenggi are used for ceremonial purpose; others include jebiburi daenggi, doturank daenggi, jjok daenggi, and malttuk daenggi. The daenggi were used for "Kungnyŏ", or court ladies, during the Joseon period were negadak daenggi and patip daenggi.

== Gallery ==
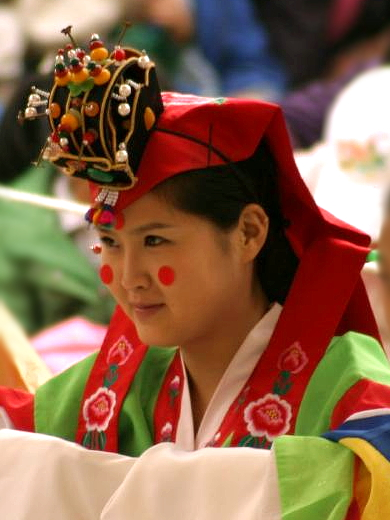
Ap daenggi, a pair of daenggi hanging from a binyeo (hairpin)

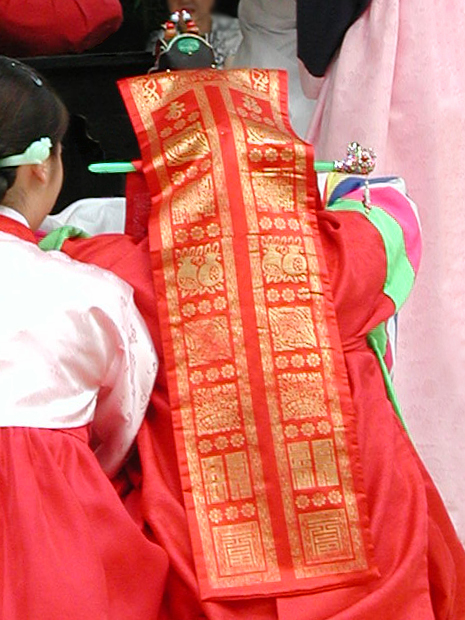
Dodeurak daenggi

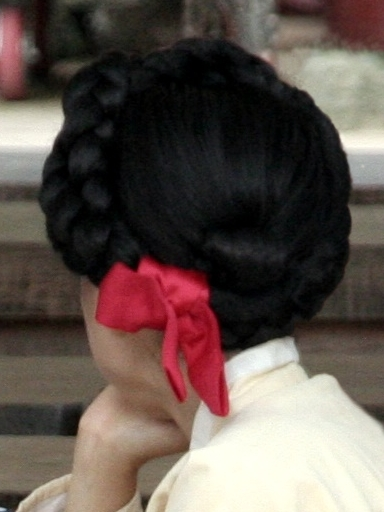
Komeori hairstyle with a daenggi

== See also ==
- Gache
- Hanbok
- Hwarot
- List of Korean clothing
