= Jokduri =

Korean traditional coronet for women

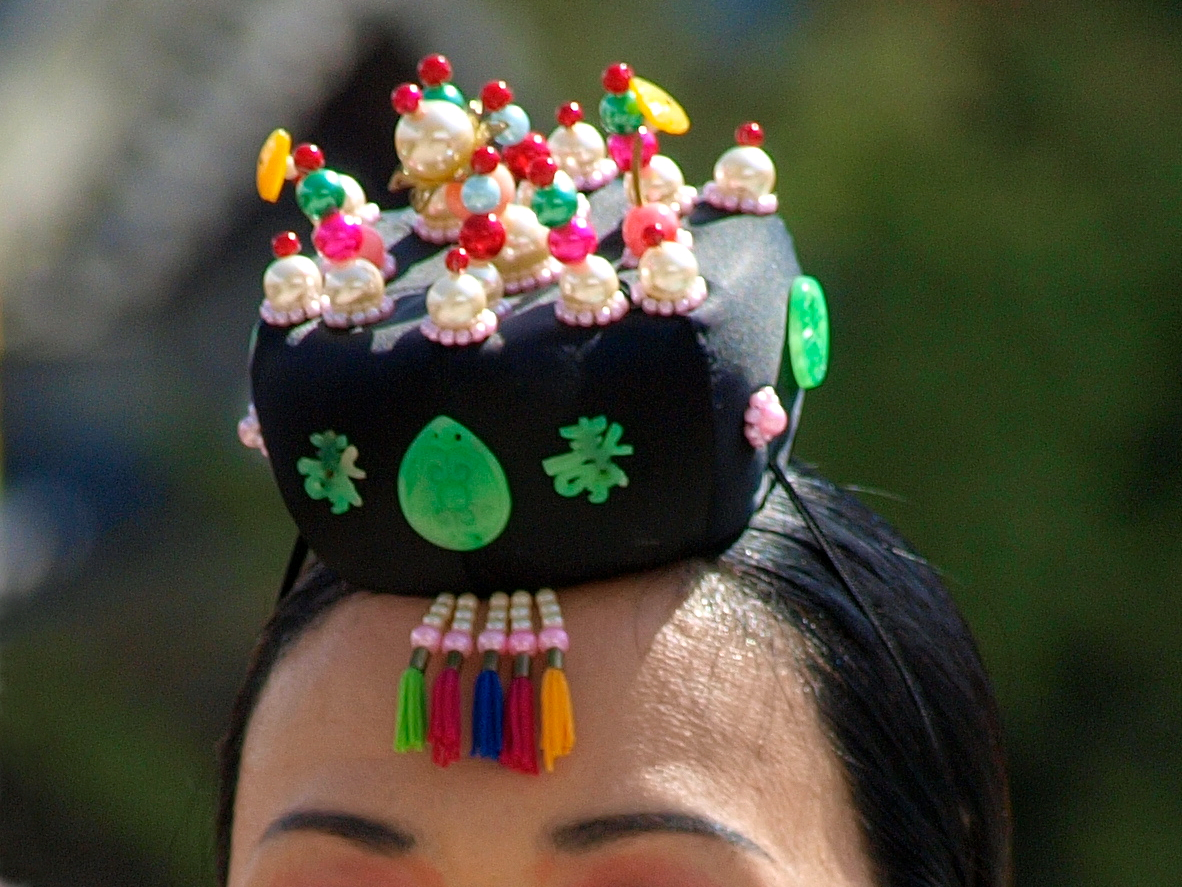

Korean name
- Hangul: 족두리; 족두; 족관
- Hanja: 簇頭里; 簇兜; 簇冠
- RR: jokduri; jokdu; jokgwan
- MR: chokturi; choktu; chokkwan

A jokduri (Korean: 족두리) is a type of traditional Korean coronet worn by women for special occasions such as weddings. Also known as a jokdu or jokgwan, it consists of an outer crown covered with black silk, and an inner which is filled with cotton and hard paper. Its top is decorated with cloisonné ornaments. The upper part is vaguely hexagonal and the bottom is cylindrical. The form of the jokduri gets narrower towards its base.

Jokduri can be used to display the wearer's social status by being adorned with accessories made from gold or silver.

== History ==
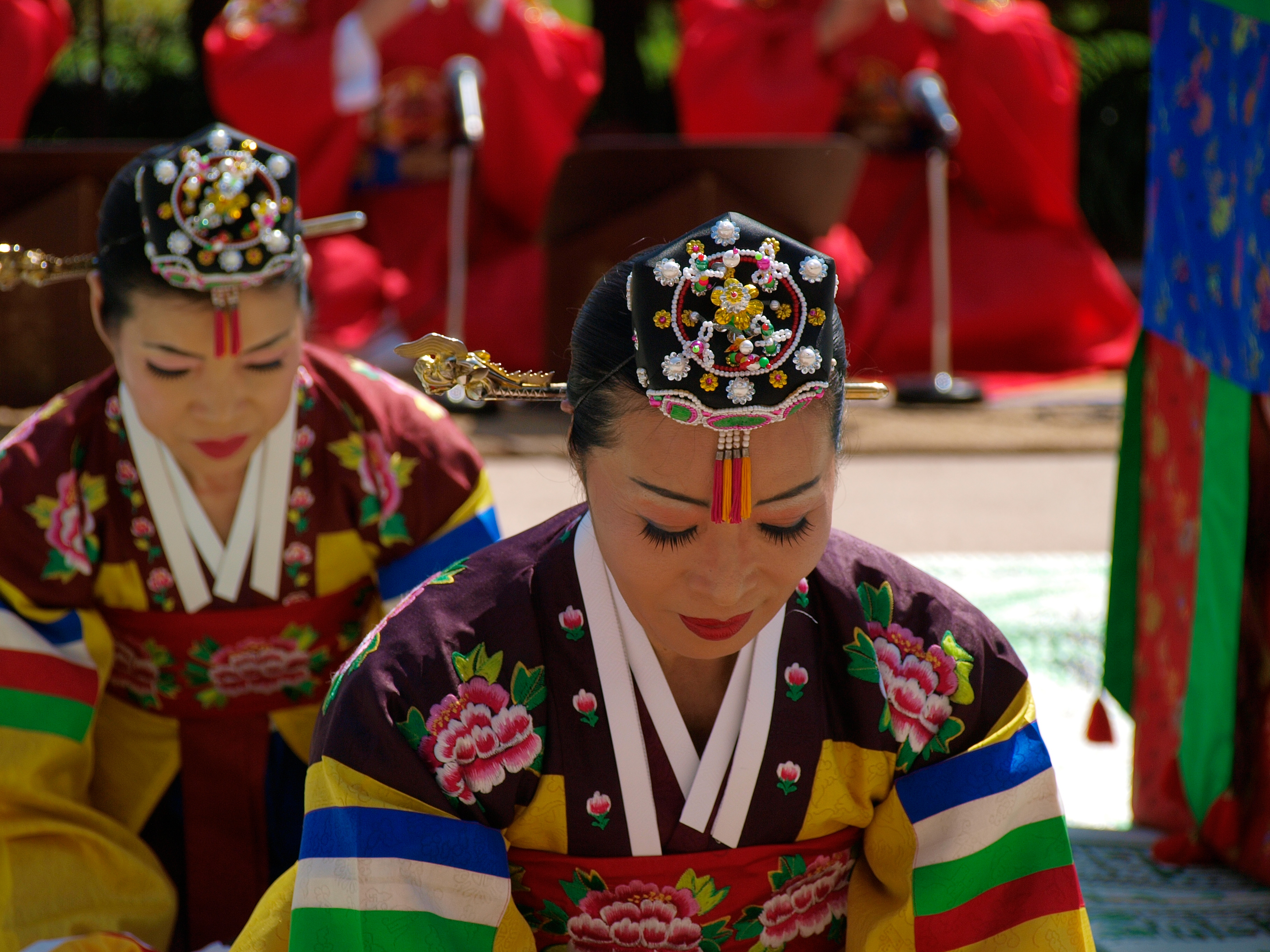
Traditional Korean dance with jokduri

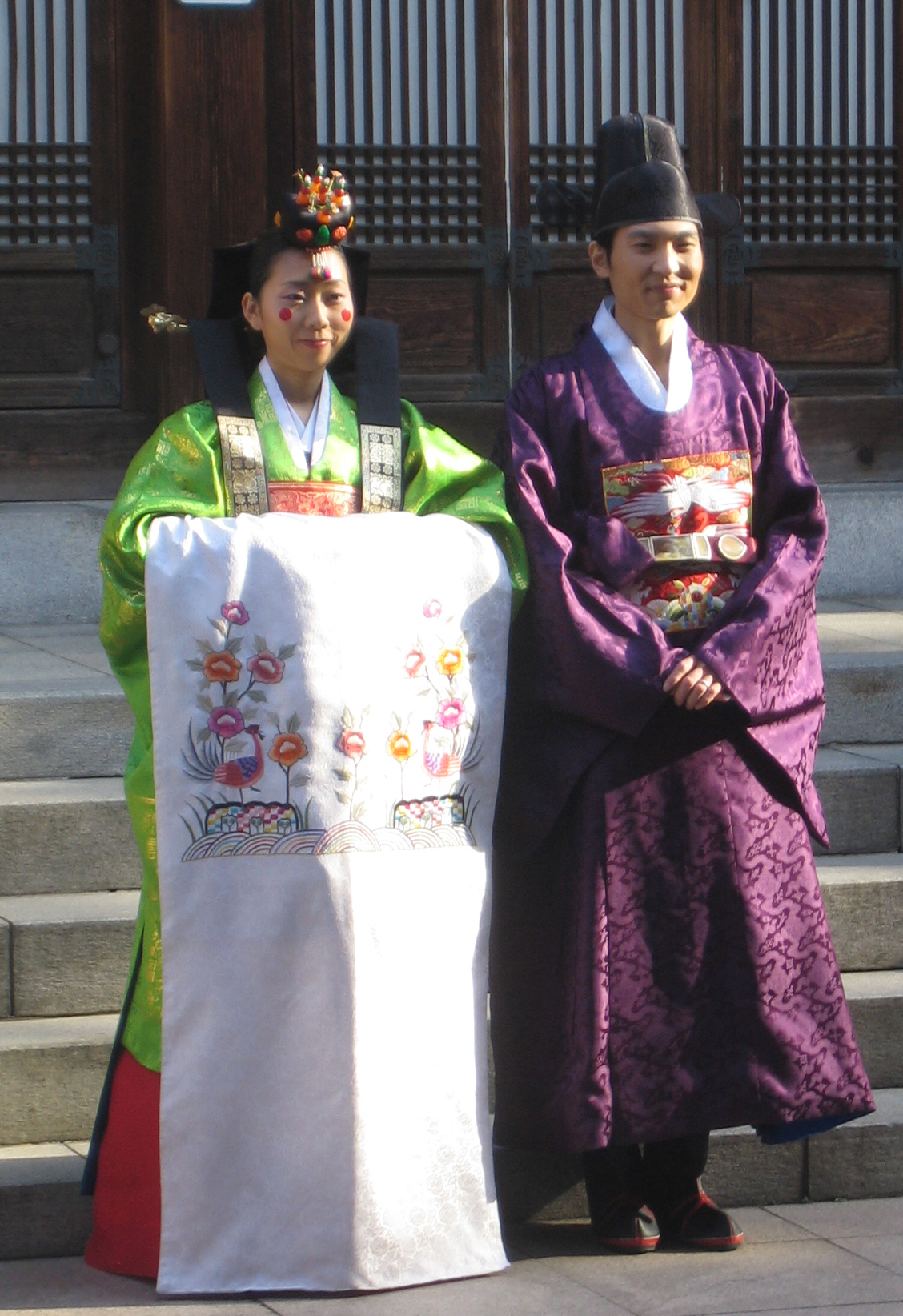
Traditional Korean wedding with jokduri

It is said that the jokduri was derived from the Mongolian woman's cap for outing, the gogori (姑姑里), in the late Goryeo period. It began to be used in that period as intermarriages between Goryeo and the Yuan dynasty of China happened. However, the jokduri during the Goryeo period is assumed to have been bigger and higher than the type seen in the Joseon period.

During the Joseon dynasty, the jokduri became smaller, with little difference in the overall shape between the top and the bottom. During the reign of King Gwanghaegun, black silk began to be used for the covering, whereas purple silk was used as the inner fabric. Thereafter, as women enjoyed wearing a jokduri, it became almost a national style in fashion.

In the late Joseon period, King Yeongjo (r. 1724–1776) and Jeongjo (r. 1776–1800) prohibited women from wearing gache (wigs) and, instead, encouraged them to wear the jokduri. In 1788, the 12th year of King Jeongjo's reign, he published an interdictory decree on jokduri, a prohibition against excessive usage of cloisonné decorations, and the designation of black fabrics for the inner material such as cotton and bamboo.

Different kinds of jokguri are used for weddings, funerals, and for daily use in the royal court.

== See also ==
- Ayam
- Crown
- Hwagwan
- Hanbok
- Headgear
- Hwarot
- Wonsam
