= Chignon (hairstyle) =

Hairstyle

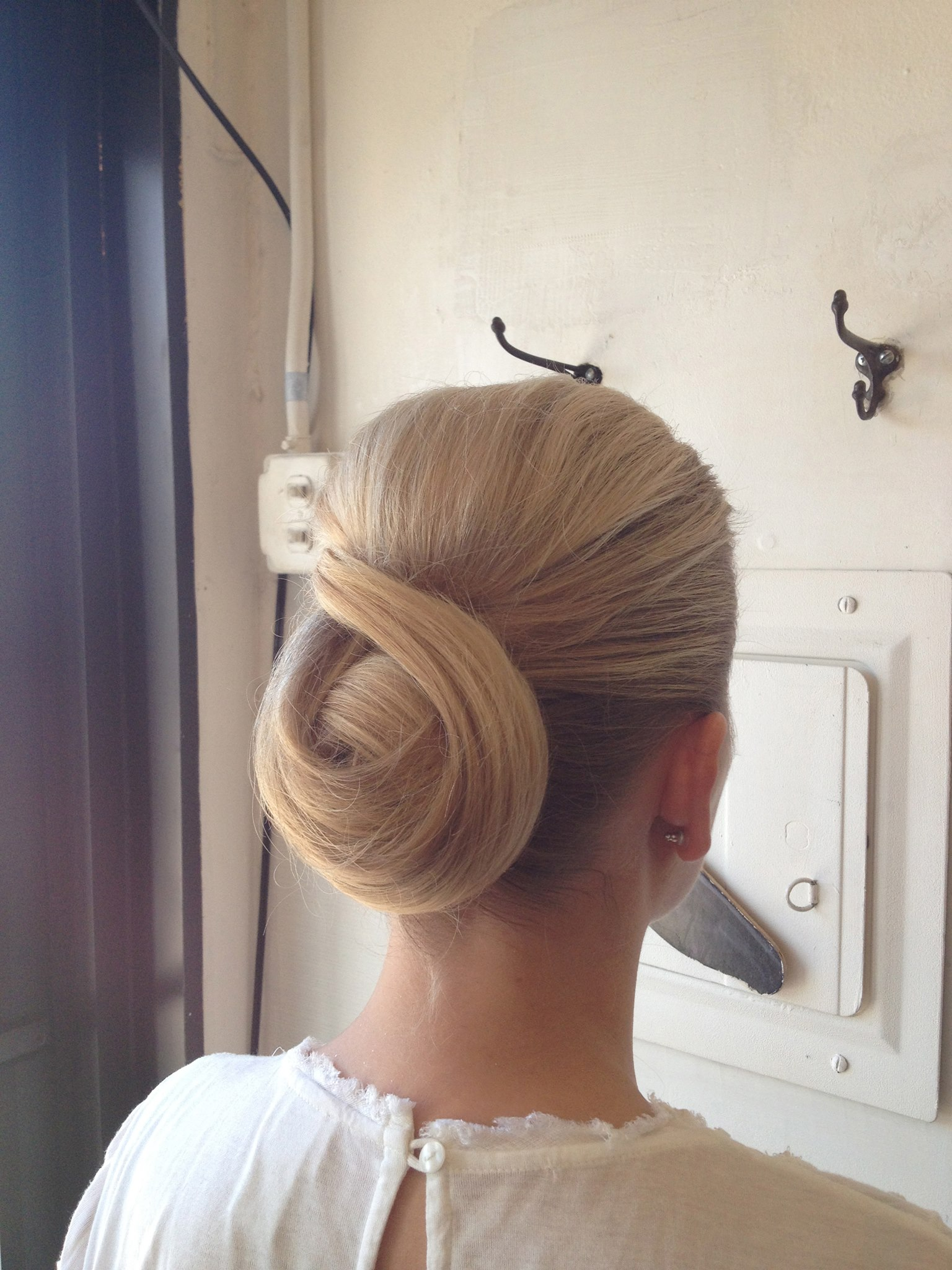
Chignon example

A chignon (UK: /ˈʃiːnjɒ̃/, US: /ˈʃiːnjɒn/; French: [ʃiɲɔ̃]), from the French chignon meaning a bun, is a hairstyle characterized by wrapped hair on the back of the head. In the United States and the United Kingdom, it is often used as an abbreviation of the French phrase chignon du cou, signifying a low bun worn at the nape of the neck.

Chignons are generally achieved by pinning the hair into a knot at the nape of the neck or at the back of the head, but there are many variations of the style. They are usually secured with accessories such as barrettes or hairpins. Chignons are frequently worn for special occasions, like weddings and formal dances, but the basic chignon is also worn for everyday casual wear.

== History ==
Actress Renate Reinsve wearing a chignon at a formal event in 2024

The chignon can be traced back to ancient Greece, where Athenian women commonly wore the style with gold or ivory handcrafted hairpins. Athenian men wore the same style, but they fastened their chignons with a clasp of "golden grasshoppers", according to The History of the Peloponnesian War, by Thucydides. The chignon was specific to Athens, as other city states, such as Cyprus and Sparta, had their own styles of hairdressing. The chignon was also popular in ancient China, where married women wore the low, knotted hairstyle.

Male writers of the Victorian era, like Anthony Trollope, were fond of poking fun at the perceived absurdity of the fashion, which was much in vogue in England in the 1860s. In the 1890s, the dancer Cléo de Mérode popularized the hairstyle in France.

== See also ==
- Bun
- Cockernonnie
- List of hairstyles

== Bibliography ==
- "Bustle-era hairstyles". demodecouture.com.
- Cox, Caroline; Leguen, Jean Marie (8 September 2003). "Chignon". Woman's Hour. BBC Radio 4.
- DeBrohun, Jeri. "Power Dressing in Ancient Greece and Rome". Commonwealth History Project. National Center for History Education. Archived from the original on 2007-02-11.
- "History of Hair". 2004. UKHairdressers. Accessed 29 April 2007.
- Martin, Kiley. "Early Hairstyling of the Hellenistic Period in Ancient Greece". Morbid Outlook. Archived from the original on 6 February 2012.
- Mayer, Tanna; et al. (28 March 2007). "How to Style a Classic Chignon". Wikihow.
