= Kach'e =

Traditional Korean wig laden with accessories

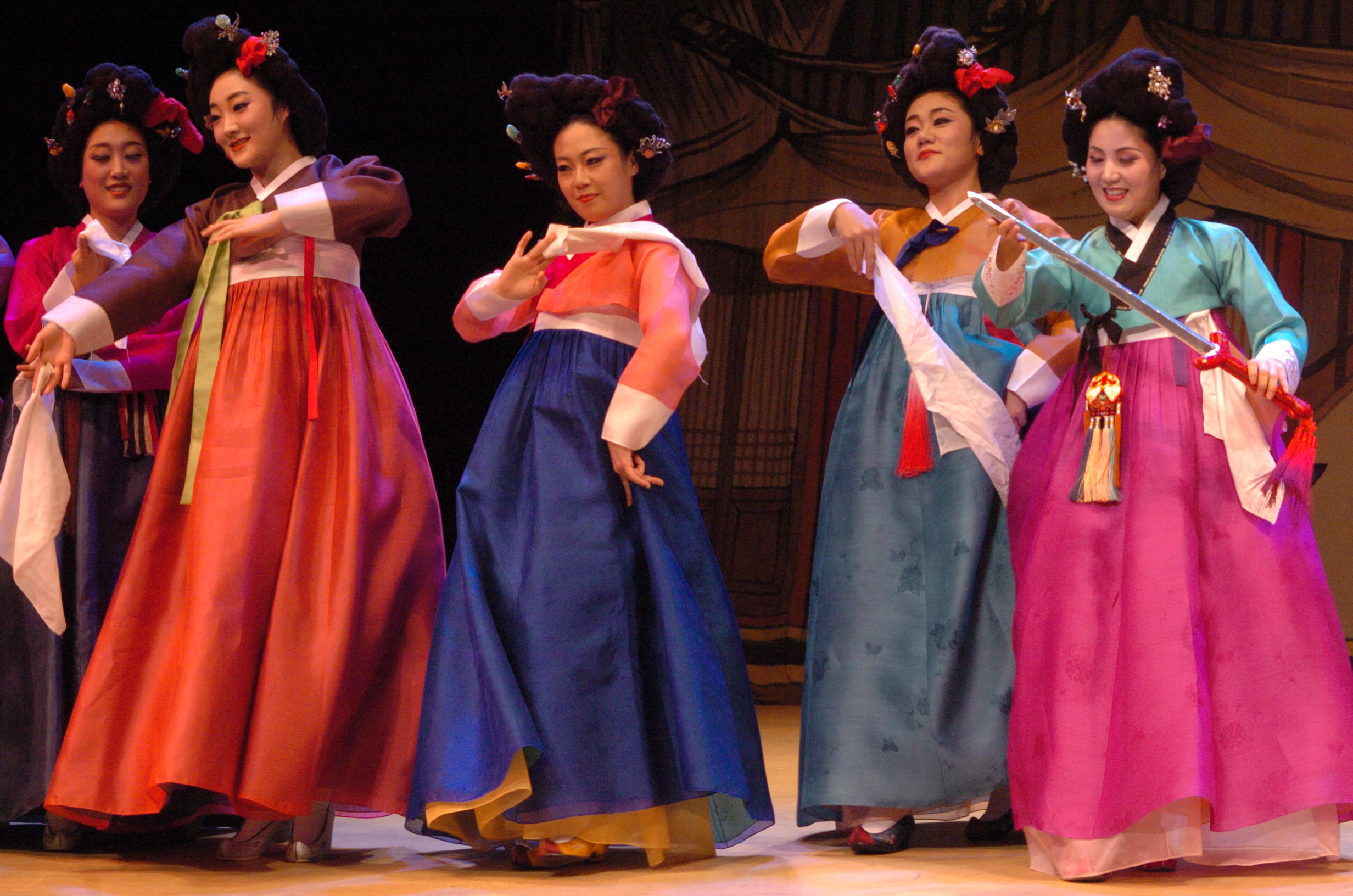

Korean name
- Hangul: 가체
- Hanja: 加髢
- RR: gache
- MR: kach'e

The kach'e (Korean: 가체; Hanja: 加髢) is a traditional Korean wig worn by women. Historically, kach'e were expensive accessories worn only by women of high social standing, alongside kisaeng. They were decorated with silk objects, gold, jewels, silver, coral, jade, and other expensive materials. Certain decorations were reserved for royalty.

== History ==
Historically, women of high social backgrounds and kisaeng wore kach'e, with larger and heavier wigs considered to be more aesthetically pleasing. Due to the expense of purchasing a new kach'e, some lower-class families took up to 6–7 years preparing a new kach'e wig for their new daughter-in-law.

Use of the kach'e flourished in Goryeo, the Three Kingdoms, Balhae, the Gaya confederacy, and Gojoseon. Kach'e were known for their relatively heavy weight, totalling around 3–4 kilograms (6.6–8.8 lb) with accessories; one record reports an incident where a heavy kach'e wig led to the death of a 13-year-old bride, as the heavy wig compromised her neck as she was getting up to greet her father-in-law entering the room. Kach'e were banned by the government in 1788.

In the 19th century, yangban women began to wear the jokduri, a small hat that substituted for the kach'e. However, kach'e were still popular in kisaeng circles and traditional weddings.

== Gallery ==
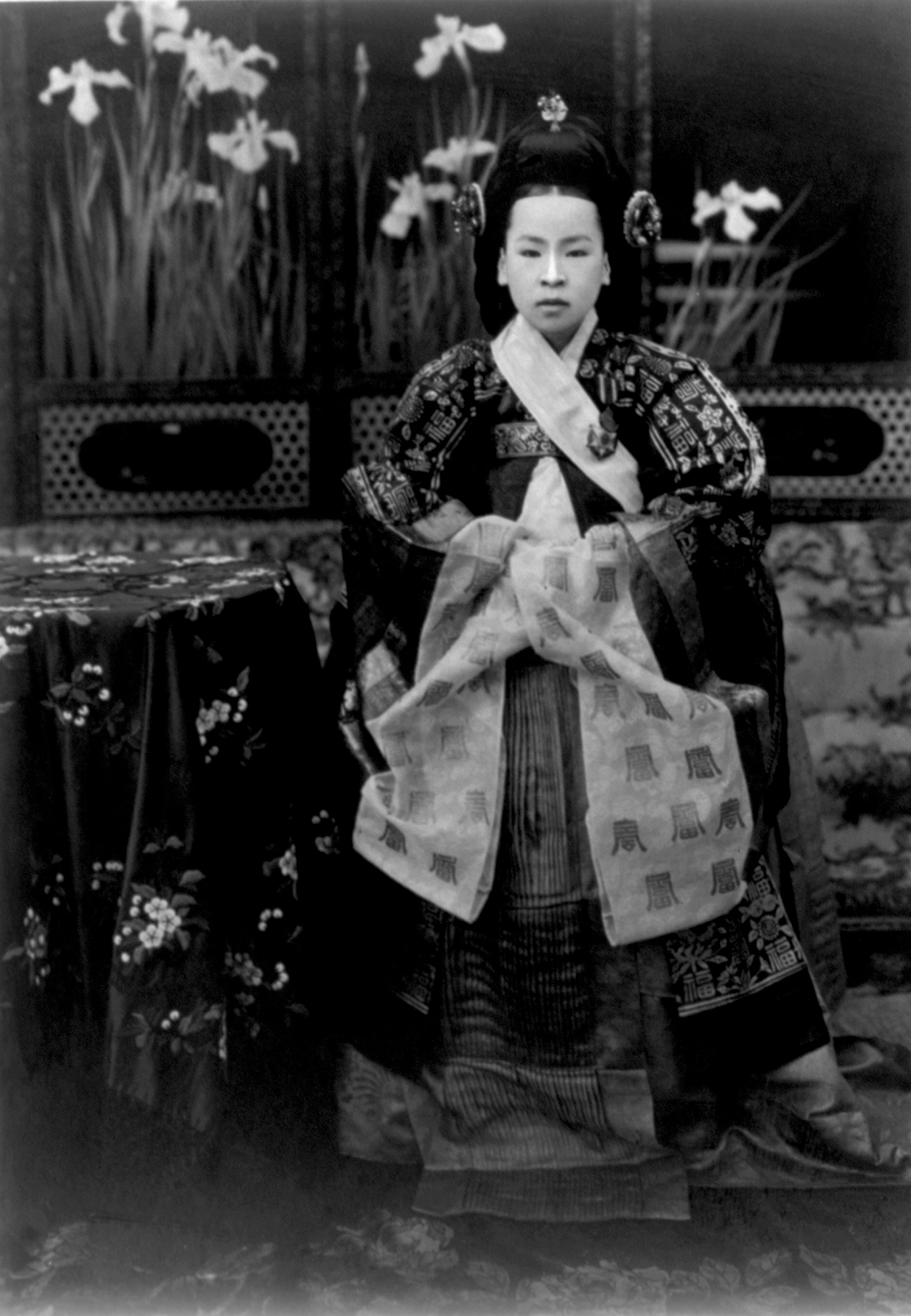
Empress Sunjeong of the Korean Empire, 1909

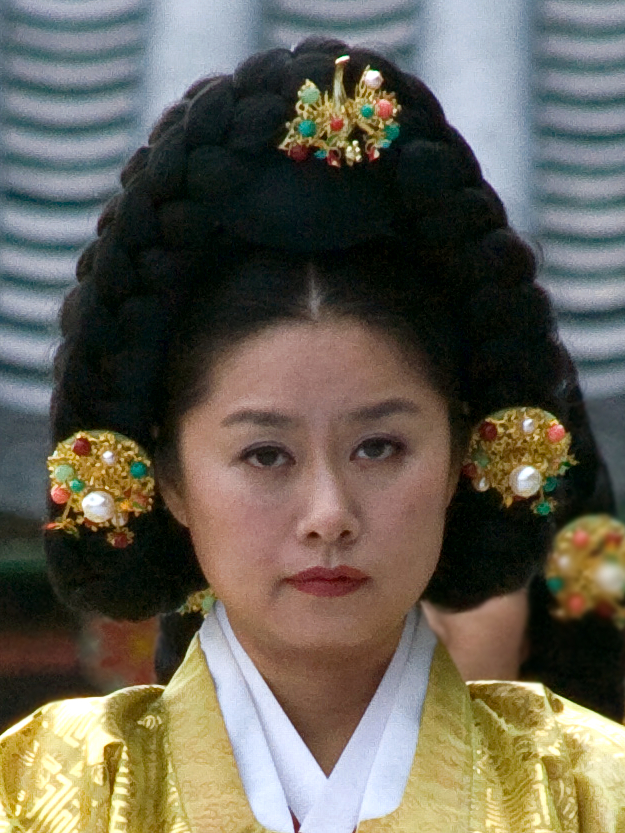
Modern representation

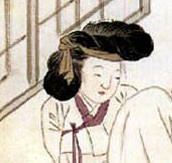
18th-century illustration of a kach'e

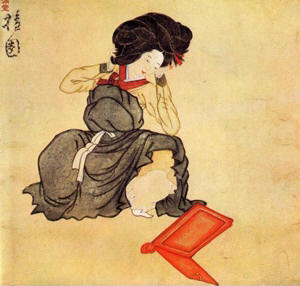
Illustration from the late 18th-century

== See also ==
- Hanbok
