= Ruqun =

Hanfu set of attire

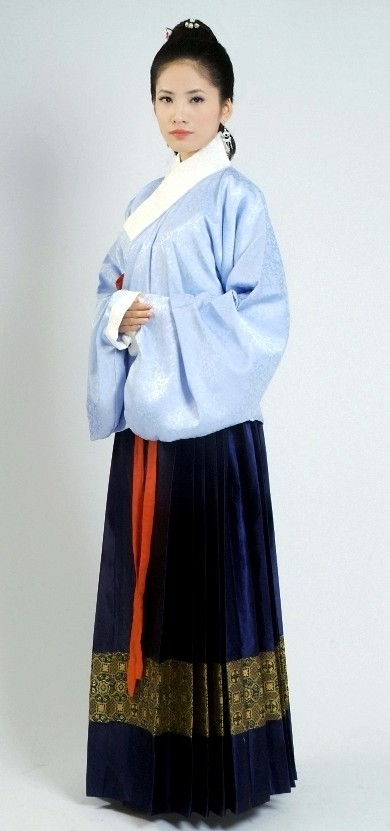
- A Chinese lady wearing an aoqun, a style of ruqun popular among Chinese women during the Ming dynasty.

Chinese name
- Traditional Chinese: 襦裙
- Simplified Chinese: 襦裙
- Literal meaning: Jacket and skirt
Transcriptions
Standard Mandarin
- Hanyu Pinyin: rúqún
Yue: Cantonese
- Jyutping: jyu4 kwan4

Korean name
- Hangul: 유군
- Hanja: 襦裙
Transcriptions
- Revised Romanization: yugun

Ruqun (Chinese: 襦裙) is a set of historical Han Chinese clothing which consists of a short jacket typically called rú (襦) worn under a long Chinese skirt called qún (裙). It has also become a general term to describe hanfu which consists of a separated upper garment and a wrap-around lower skirt, replacing the generic term yīcháng (衣裳). In this sense, ruqun can include the shanqun (衫裙) and aoqun (袄裙; 襖裙) in its definition.

The ruqun was worn by both men and women; it was however primarily worn by women. It is the traditional Chinese attire for women. The aoqun and/or ruqun is the most basic set of clothing of Han Chinese women in China and has been an established tradition for thousands of years. Various forms and style of Chinese trousers, referred broadly under the generic term ku, can also be worn under the ruqun.

== Terminology ==
Illustration of qingyiqun (青衣裙) from the Gujin Tushu Jicheng, Qing dynasty.

The generic term yīcháng (衣裳) can be applied to any style of clothing consisting of a pair of upper and lower garments. The term yichang is composed of yī (衣; "upper garment") and cháng (裳; "lower garment"). Cháng (裳) can refer to either the skirt, qun, or the trousers, ku/kun. The character yi is also a generic word for "clothing". Therefore, the ruqun, aoqun, shanqun, as well as the wedding dress called qungua, all belong to the category of yichang as a broad term.

The term rúqún (襦裙) is composed of two Chinese characters: rú (襦; "jacket") and qún (裙; "skirt"); thus ruqun can literally be translated as "jacket skirt". However, ruqun is a fluid term in both original texts and in secondary sources, as different regions may use different terms to describe the same clothing. When used as a broad term, ruqun refers to a set of attire which consists of a separate upper garment and a qun skirt as a lower garment. As a specific term, ruqun refer to a specific style of wearing a short upper garment called rú (襦) under a long skirt called qún (裙). The word ruqun has also sometimes been used as a synonym for other clothing items such as shān (衫) and ǎo (袄; 襖). The ruqun can also be a short jacket with either short or long sleeves. In addition, the term changru (长襦; 'long ru') also appear in texts and has been described as the precursor of the long jacket chang ao ("long jacket") by scholars.

Modern illustration of two traditional forms of ruqun (襦裙), a type of Han Chinese clothing worn primarily by women.

The term ǎoqún (袄裙; 襖裙) typically refers to a specific way of wearing the ao over the lower garment, qun. The Chinese character 襖 appears in a Sui dynasty rime dictionary called Qieyun, published in 601 AD, and can be translated as "padded coat", but it can also refer to a lined upper garment. The Xinhua Dictionary defines ao as a general term referring to an "upper garment with multiple layers". As such, it is a thick piece of clothing worn mostly during cold seasons. Usually, the ao is worn outside of the lower garment, which is often a skirt, especially the mamianqun.

Illustration of a shān (衫) from the Gujin Tushu Jicheng, Qing dynasty.

The term shānqún (衫裙), sometimes literally translated as "unlined upper garment and skirt" in English, is also type of clothing style where the upper garment called shan is generally worn over the lower garment, qun. The Xinhua Dictionary defines shan as a general term referring to an "upper garment with a single layer". The Jin dynasty book Gujinzhu (古今注) states that women had been wearing one-piece clothing that has the upper and lower garments connected together since the time of the Yellow Emperor, until the Qin dynasty, when shan was invented.

Historically, the shan comes in as varying styles, shapes and lengths, and is usually worn outside of the lower garment. However, there are also cases where the shan is worn under the lower garment, as during the Jin dynasty. A form of shan which appeared in the Han and Wei period was a new type of gown which had equal front pieces which were straight, called duijin, instead of jiaoling collar and was fastened with a string; it was also a form of unlined upper garment with straight sleeves and wide cuffs. This shan was worn by men and women and became popular as it was more convenient for wearing.

In addition, the term shanqun is sometimes used interchangeably with ruqun to refer to short upper garment worn on skirt. The term shan can also refer to long garments.

Of note of importance, the term yichang is not only used to describe the specific types of Hanfu, but also modern western clothing styles consisting of separate top and bottom garments as well.

== Cultural significance ==
=== Heaven and Earth symbolism ===
In traditional Chinese culture, the symbolism of two-pieces garments hold great importance as it symbolizes the greater order of Heaven and Earth. In the Yi Jing (易經), upper garment represents Heaven (Qian) while the lower garment represents the Earth (Kun). It is also why the mianfu (and the yichang in the Yi Jing) has a black upper garment and typically a red (or yellow) lower garment which symbolized the order between Heaven and earth and should never be confused. According to the Wuxing (五行), black symbolized the colour of the sky, which was dark before dawn, while the colour yellow represented the earth.

The order between Heaven and Earth can also translate into clothing length differences between men and women. For example, in 1537, in an attempt to reverse the trend in the late Ming when women clothing was gradually getting longer, Huo Tao, a Ming dynasty Minister of Rites, expressed:

Men's and women's styles differ in length. A woman's upper garment is level with her waist, her lower garment meets with the top: earth supports heaven. A man's upper garment covers his lower garments: heaven embraces earth. When a woman's [upper] garment covers her lower garments, there is confusion between male and female.

==== Shangjian xiafeng ====
The silhouette of yichang can also be made into frugal top and rich bottom shàngjiǎn xiàfēng (上俭下丰), which looks like an A-line silhouette. The shangjian xiafeng was a trend in the Wei, Jin, Northern, Southern dynasties. However, during the Ming dynasty, shangjian xiafeng silhouette created with the use of maweiqun reflected an inversion of "Heaven and Earth order". The Shuyuan zaji (椒园杂记) refers to the maweiqun as being fuyao (服妖); the maweiqun was eventually banned in the early Hongzhi era (1487–1505) according to Lu Rong.

Fuyao is a general term with negative connotation which is employed for what is considered as being strange clothing style, or for deviant dressing styles, or for aberrance in clothing. Clothing which was considered fuyao typically (i) violated ritual norms and clothing regulations, (ii) were extravagant and luxurious form of clothing, (iii) violated the yin and yang principle, and (iv) were strange and inauspicious form of clothing.

== History ==
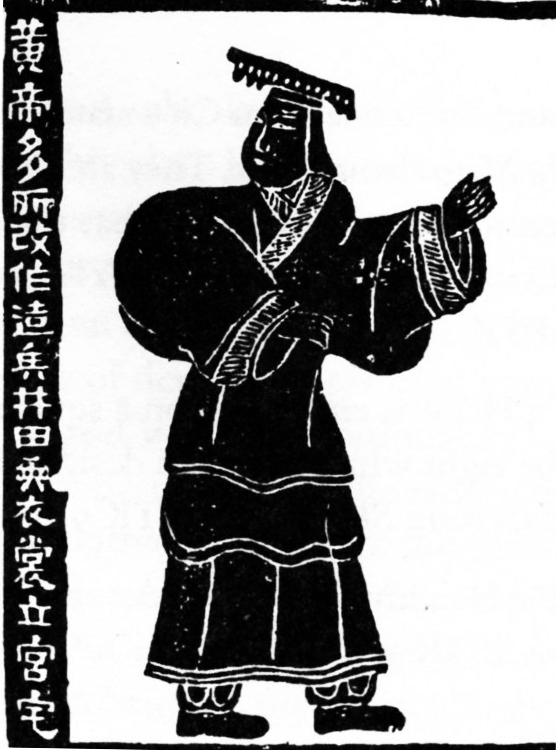
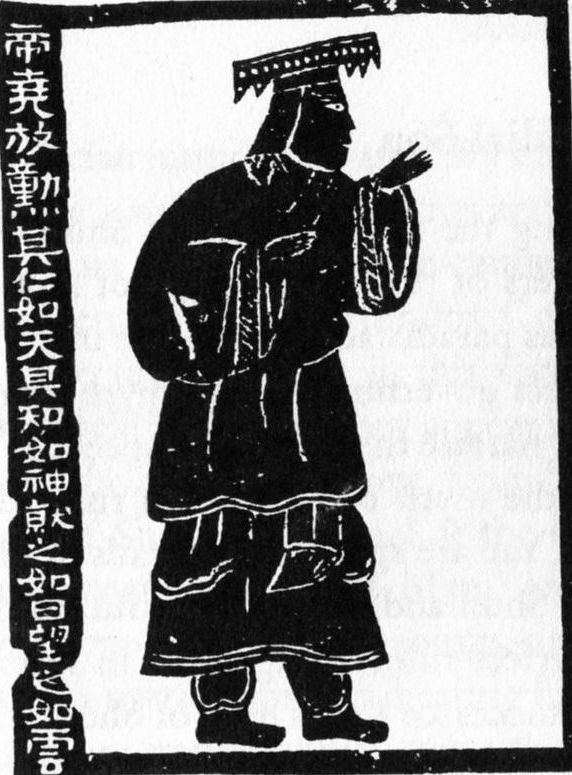
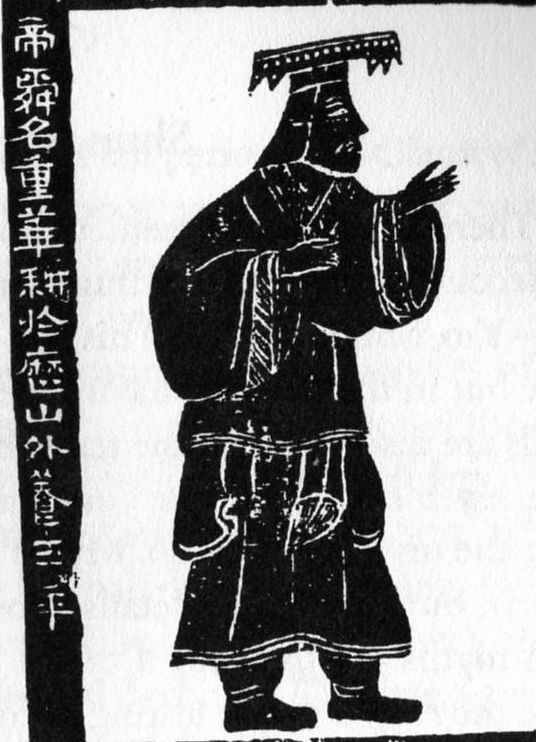
From left to right: Huangdi, Emperor Yao, and Emperor Shun, all wearing a yichang, mural painting, Han dynasty.

As a set of attired consisting of an upper garment and a skirt; the ruqun is the eldest type of hanfu. According to the chapter Xi Ci Xia《系辞下》 of the Yi Jing, the {ruqun was worn in Three Sovereigns and Five Emperors period by the legendary Yellow Emperor, Emperor Shun, and Emperor Yao who wore it in the form of the yichang (衣裳):

Hence it was that these (sovereigns) were helped by Heaven; they had good fortune, and their every movement was advantageous. Huang Di, Yao, and Shun (simply) wore their [yichang (衣裳)] (as patterns to the people), and good order was secured all under heaven.

=== Shang dynasty ===
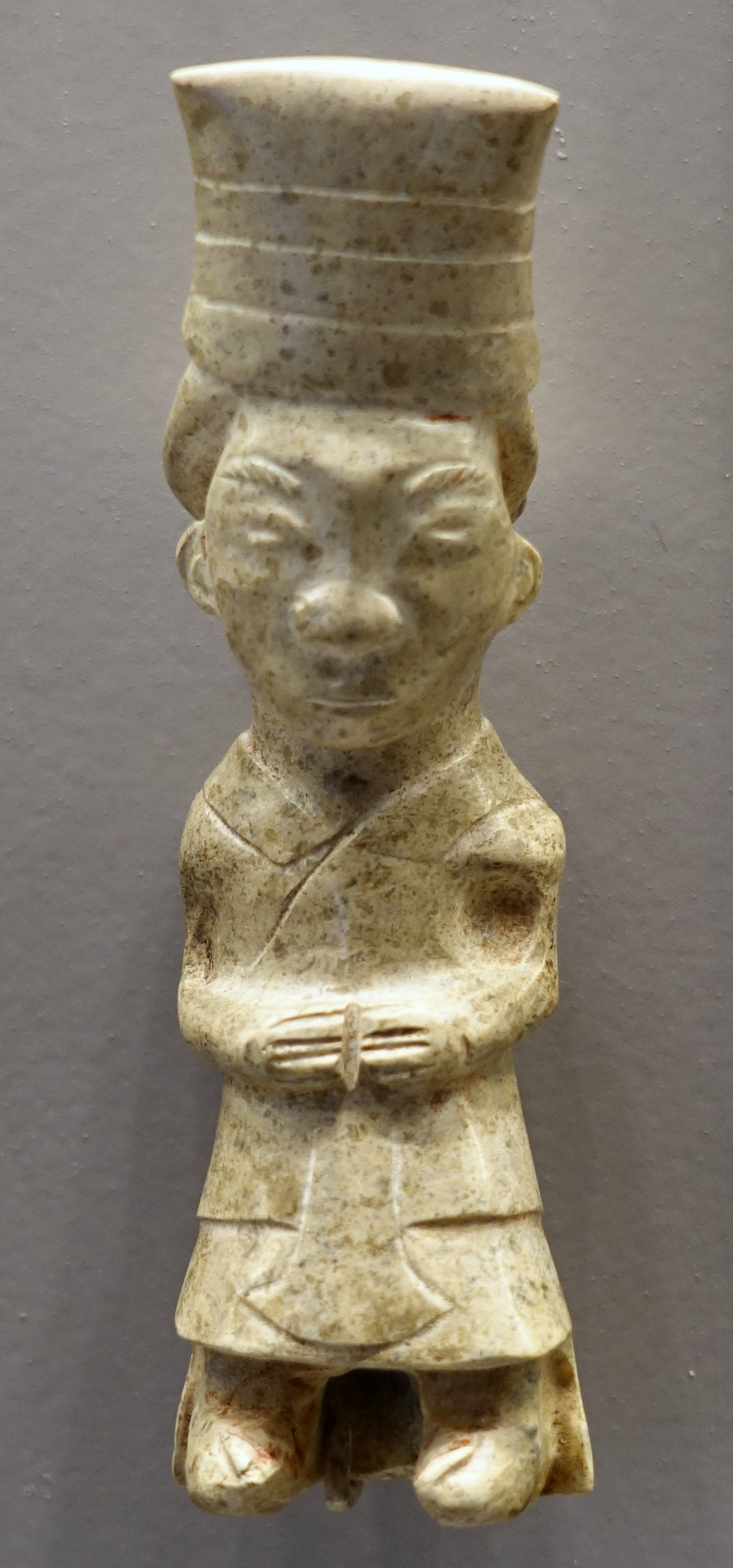
A standing dignitary wearing yichang with a bixi, Shang dynasty.

In Shang dynasty, the basic form of hanfu was established as the combination of a separate upper and lower garment worn together; which was known as yichang (衣裳). In this period, the yichang was a unisex set of attire. The yichang consisted of a narrow, ankle length skirt called chang (裳) and the upper garment called yi (衣), in shape of a knee-length tunic with narrow cuffs; the yi was tied with a sash and could be jiaoling youren. The yichang as a set of attire featured the wearing of yi over the chang.

=== Zhou dynasty ===
The Zhou dynasty, people continued to wear the yichang. The yichang was similar to the one worn in the Shang dynasty period; however the Zhou-dynasty style yichang was slightly looser and the sleeves could either be broad or narrow. The yi was jiaoling youren and a sash was used around the waist to tie it closed. The length of the chang, could also vary from knee to ground length. In the Western Zhou dynasty, it was popular to wear ruqun as a set of attire consisting of a jacket and skirt.

==== Spring and Autumn period, and Warring States period ====
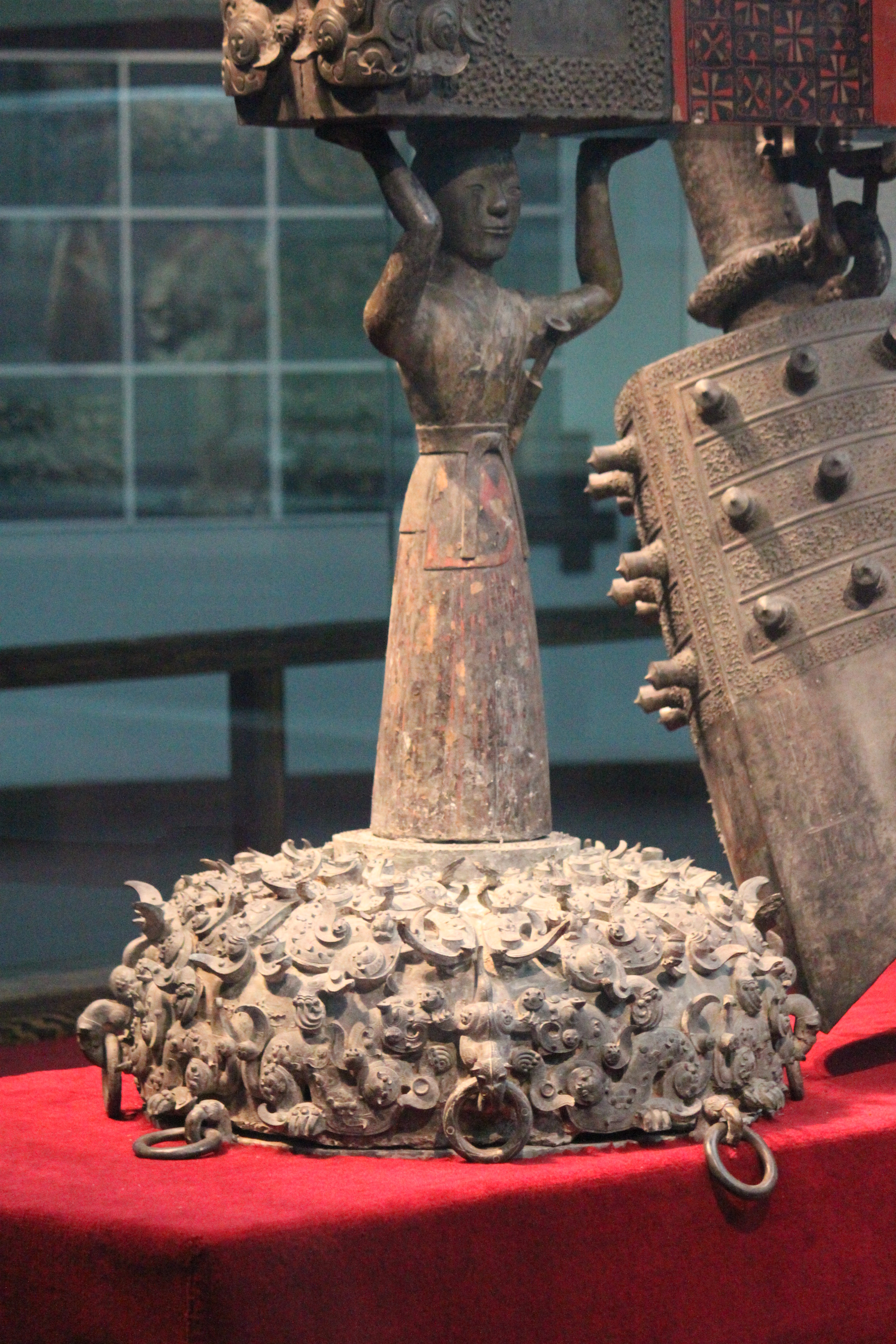
Man wearing shanqun (or ruqun) featured in the bronze armed warrior holding up chime bells.

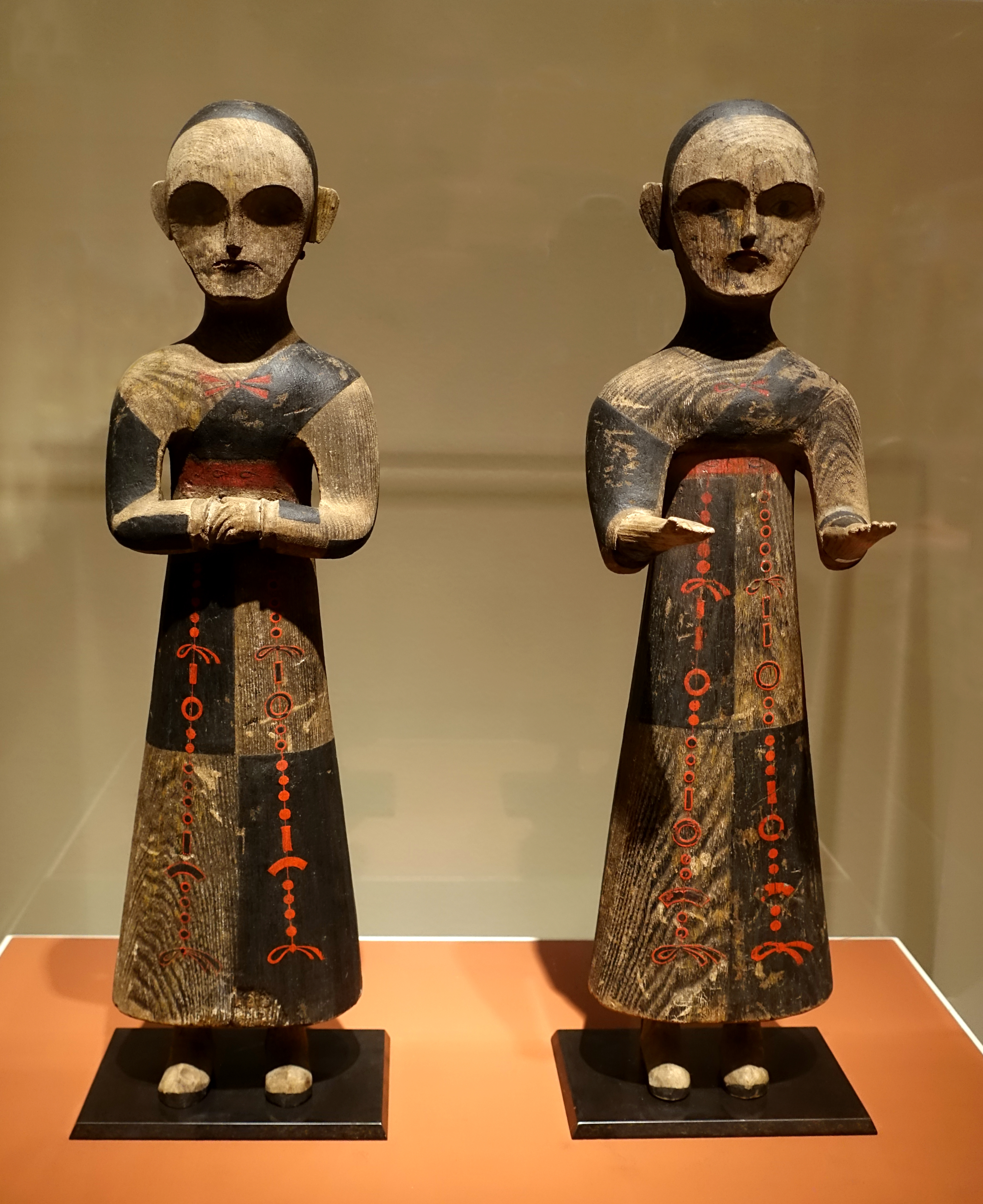
Pair of shamans or attendants, Chu culture, Warring States period, 4th-3rd century BC, Portland Art Museum, Oregon.

The ruqun as a set of attire was also worn by men and women during the Warring States period. Elites women in the Warring States period also wore a blouse or a jacket, which was fastened to the right to form a V-shaped collar and was waist-length, along with a long full skirt. The women's blouse tended to have relatively straight and narrow sleeves. During the Warring States period and the Spring and Autumn period, the clothing known as shenyi, which combined the upper and lower garment into a one-piece robe was also developed.

=== Qin and Han dynasty ===
Even though the clothing of the Warring states period were old, they continued to be worn in Qin and Han dynasties, this included the wearing of cross-collared blouse and skirts.

The ruqun as a set of attire was worn by both elite and ordinary women. Ordinary women during the Han dynasty wore the ruqun with the jacket being covered by the qun, which came in various colours throughout the year. Ordinary women wore plainer form of ruqun; the skirts were typically plain but the sash which was worn around the waist was decorated.

During the Qin and Han dynasties, women wore skirts which was composed of four pieces cloth sewn together; a belt was often attached to the skirt, but the use of a separate belt was sometimes used by women. The popularity of the jacket and skirt combination briefly declined after the fall of the Eastern Han dynasty, but returned into fashion in the Jin and Northern Wei dynasties and continued to be worn until the Qing dynasty.

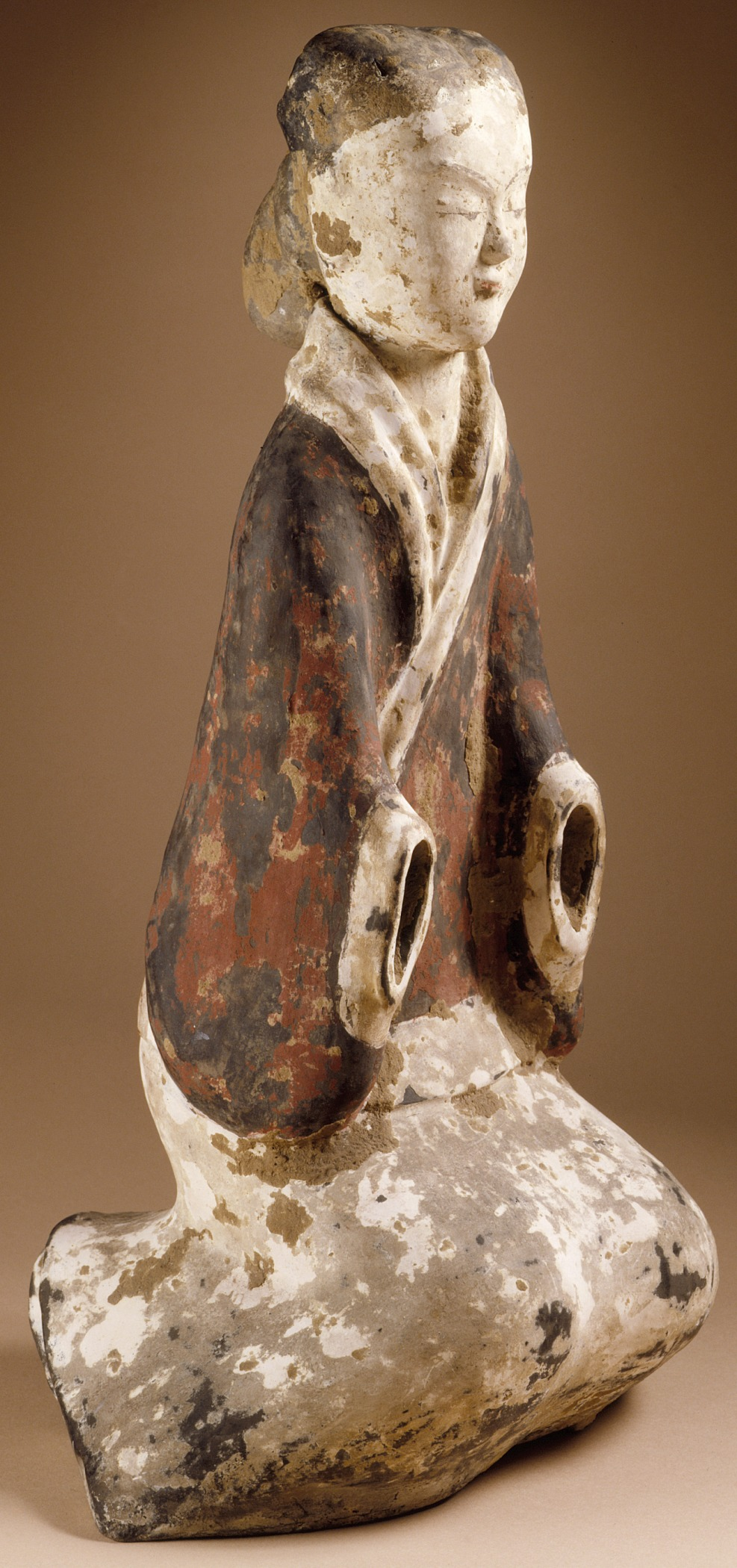
A noble lady figure, Western Han dynasty, 206 B.C.-A.D. 25.

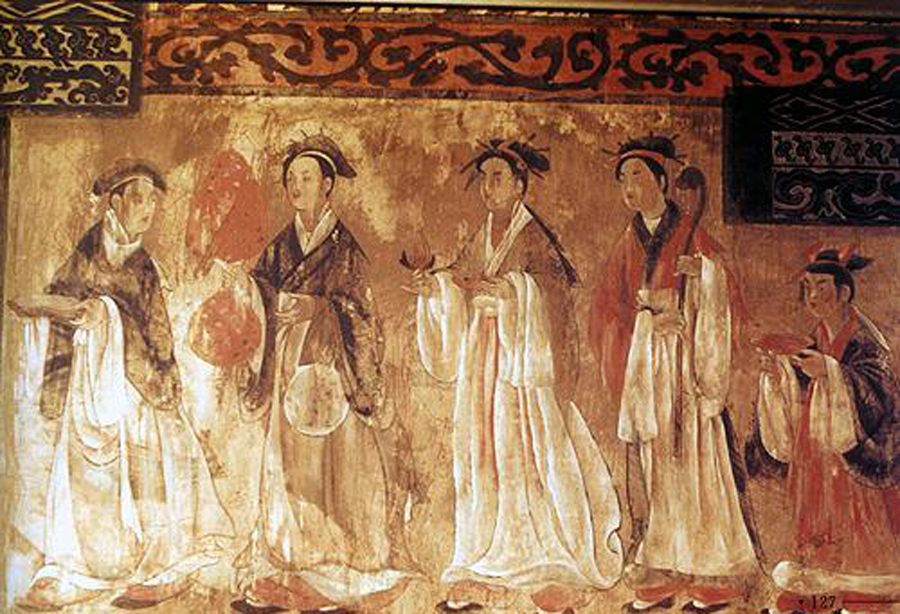
A Han dynasty painting illustrates women wearing ruqun, with blouses tucked into skirts

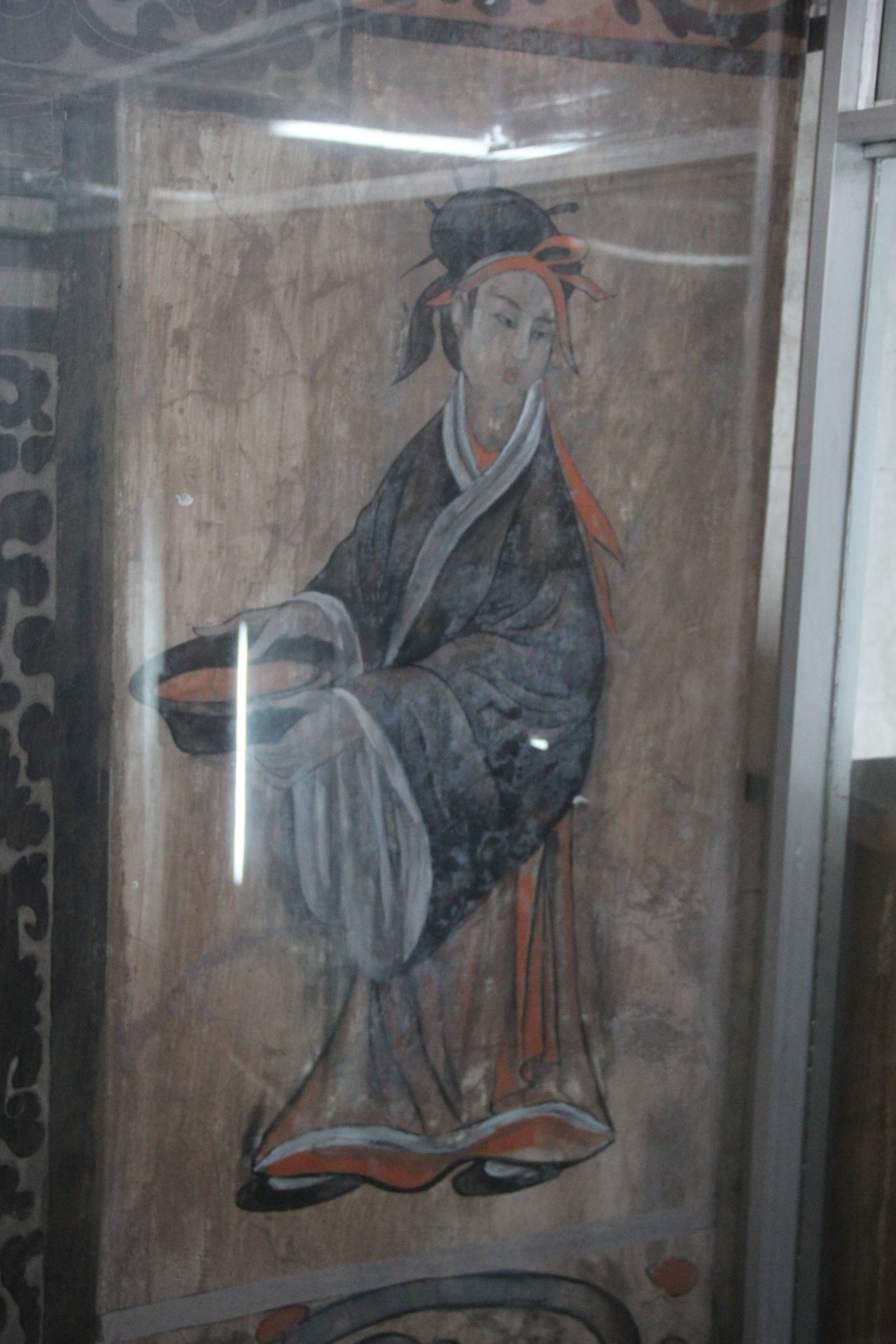
A woman in ruqun, i.e. a black cross-collar upper garment tucked inside a red skirt, Dahuting Eastern Han Tombs Mural.

=== Wei, Jin, Northern and Southern dynasties ===
During the Wei, Jin, Southern and Northern dynasties, both the ruqun and the shanqun co-existed. The ruqun was popular among women during the Wei, Jin, Southern and Northern dynasties. In the early Six dynasties period, women wore a style of ruqun composed of a jiaoling youren ru and a long qun. The jacket worn by commoner women was longer than commoner's men.

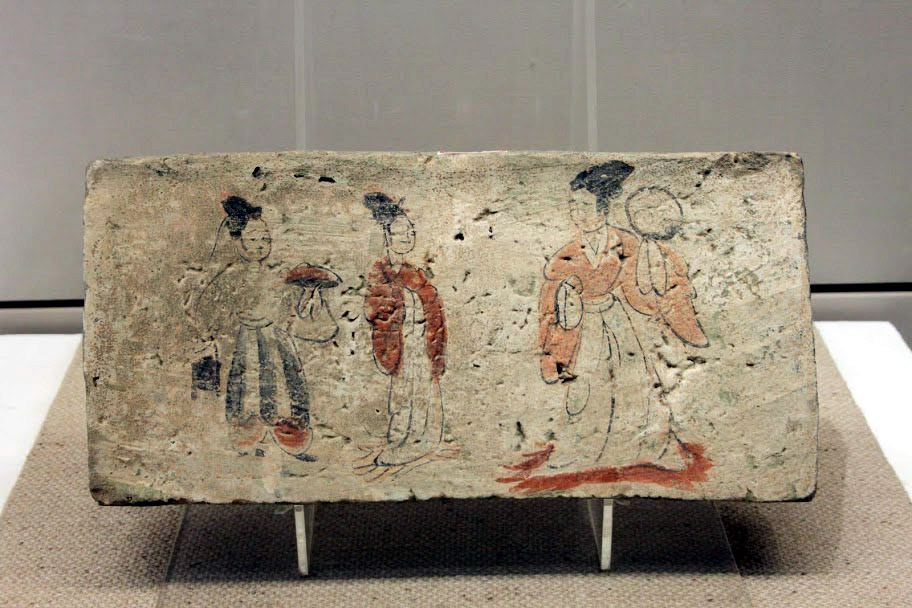
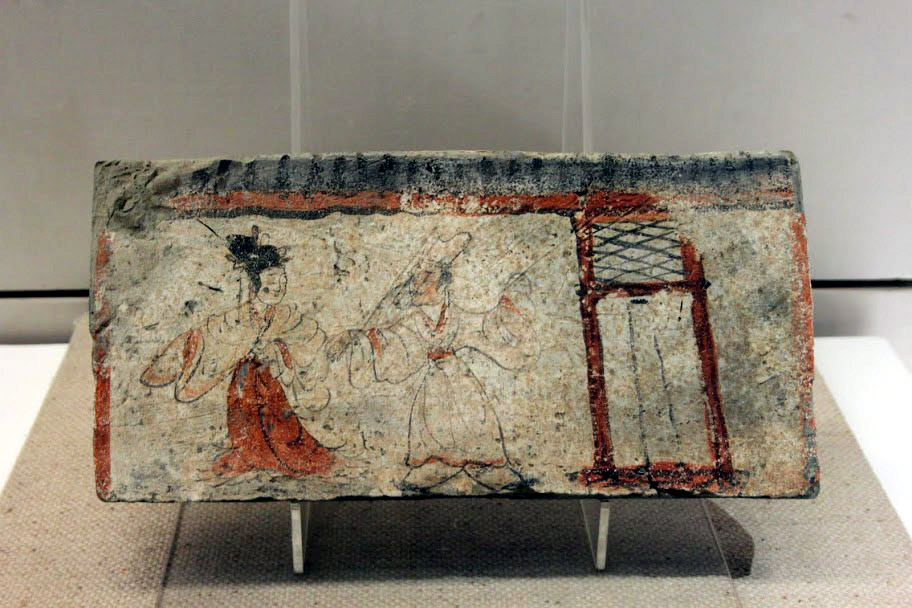
Women wearing jiaoling ruqun, Three Kingdom period, early Six dynasties period

Elite women in the Wei and Jin dynasty wore the combination of a wide-cuffed, V-shaped, unlined blouse, which was made of pattern fabric and was lined at the neck with a decorative strip of cloth, a long skirt which came in different styles, and apron. However, in the early Six dynasties, most ordinary men did not wear ruqun anymore; men, instead wore a set of attire referred as shanku consisting of ku, trousers, under their cross-collared jacket (i.e. ). The men's jacket were either hip-length or knee-length. The jackets can be tied with a belt or with other forms of closure.

The shàngjiǎn xiàfēng (上俭下丰; 'top is frugal', 'bottom is rich') (similar to A-line silhouette) style was also a trend in the Wei, Jin, Northern, Southern dynasties, where skirts large and loose giving an elegant and unrestrained effect.

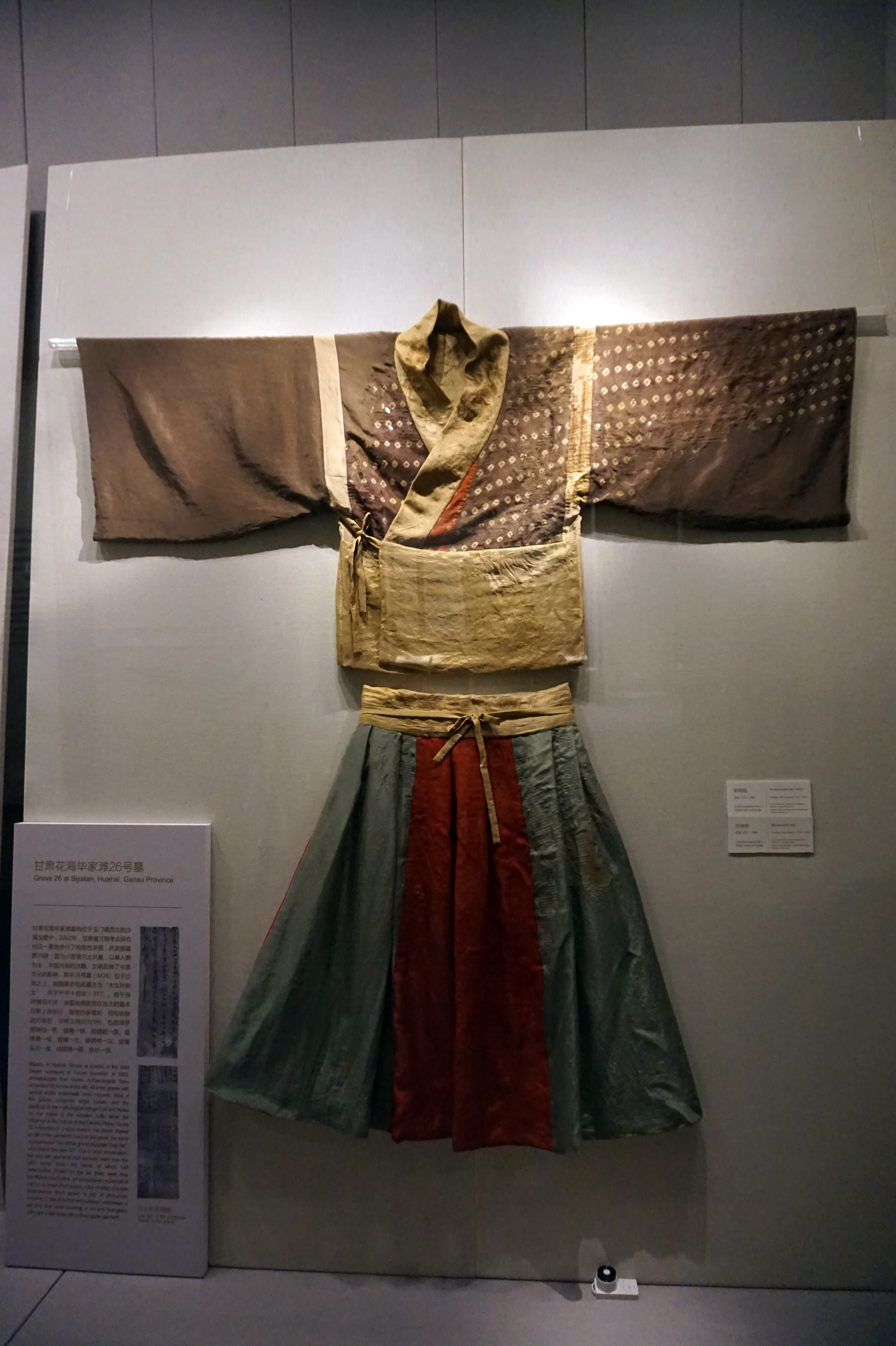
a

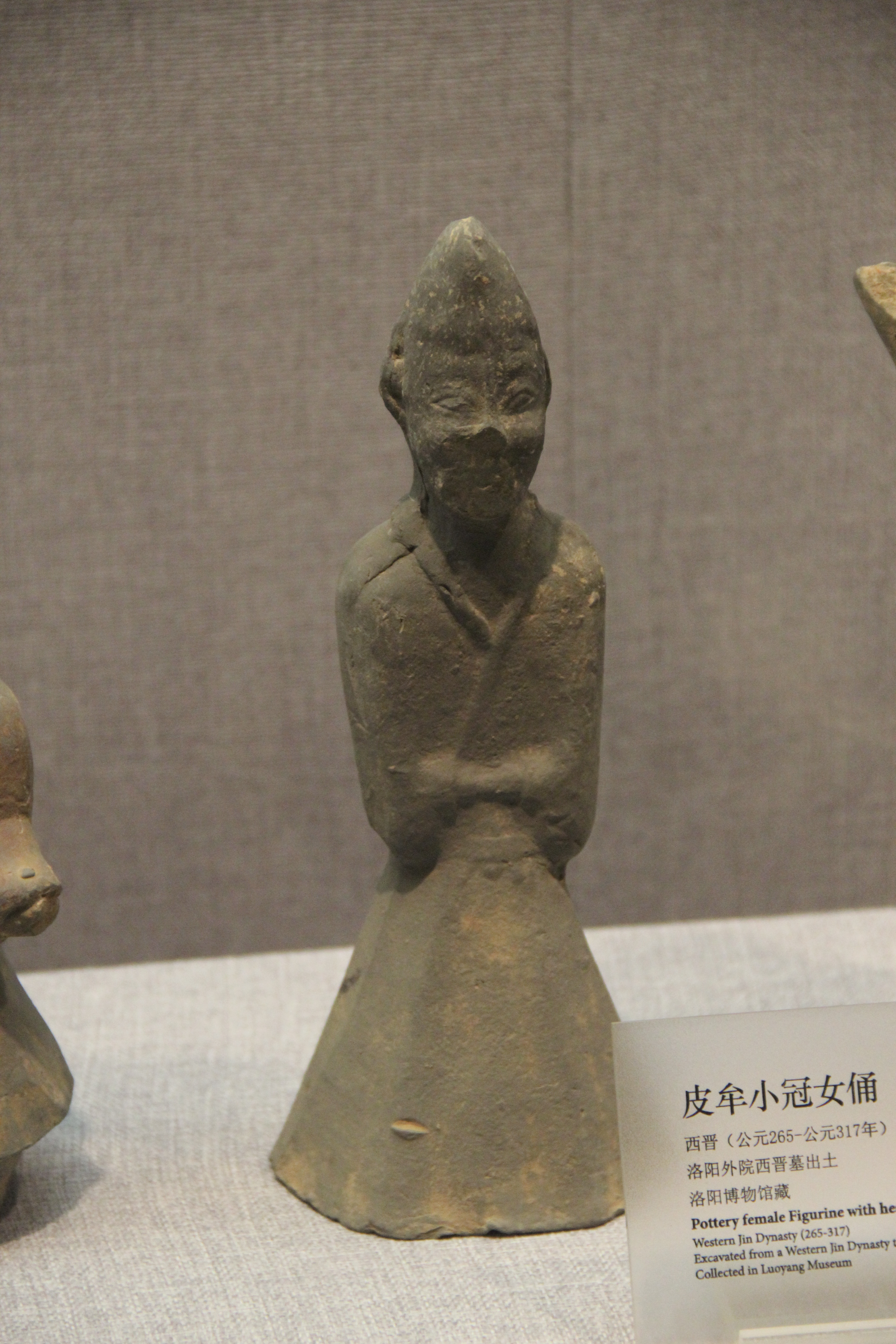
b

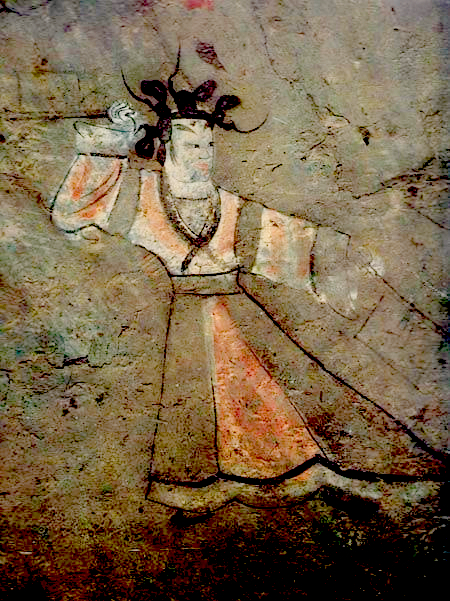
c

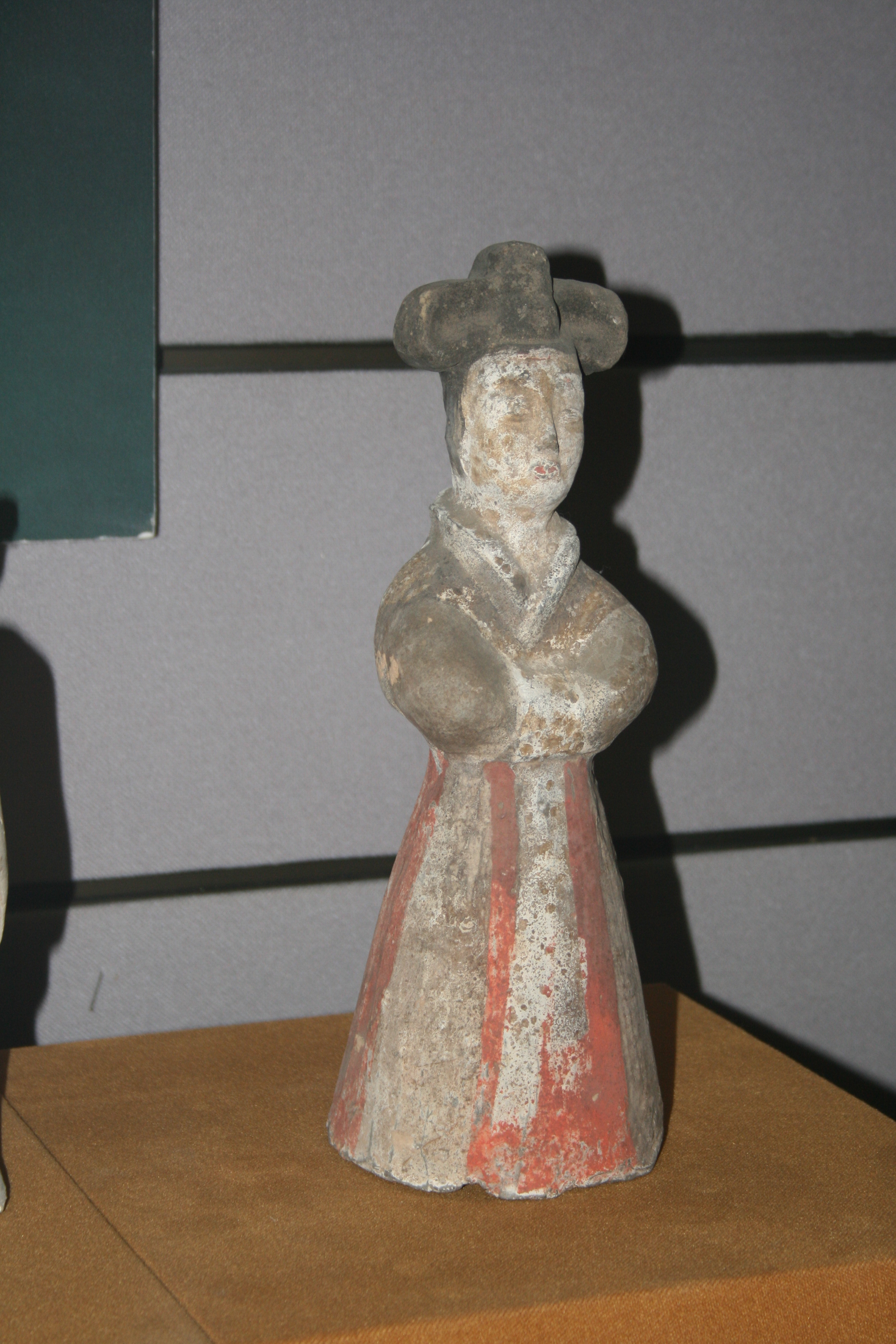
d

From left to right: a) unearthed artifacts of ruqun, Former Qin; jiaoling youren ruqun in the shangjian xiafeng-style: b) Western Jin period (266–316), c) Northern Liang, Sixteen Kingdoms and d) Northern Wei

During the Wei and Jin dynasties, women also wore the shanqun, which consisted of a long qun and a shan, an unlined upper garment. The shanqun found in this period were typically large and loose; the shan had a duijin front and was tied at the waist. A wéicháng (围裳; 圍裳), which looked similar to an apron, was tied between the shan and qun in order to fasten the waist. Styles of shanqun can be found in the Dunhuang murals where they are worn by the benefactors, in the pottery figurines unearthed in Luoyang, and in the paintings of Gu Kaizhi.

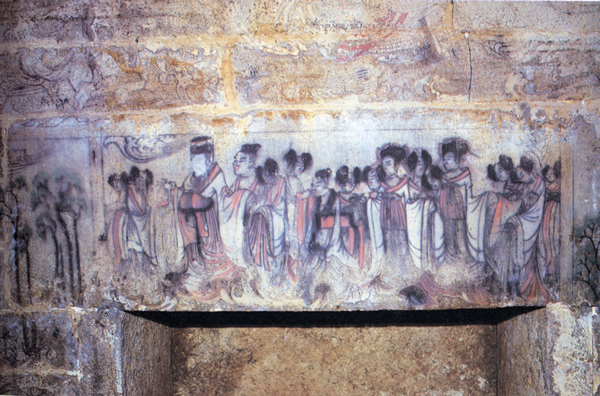
a)

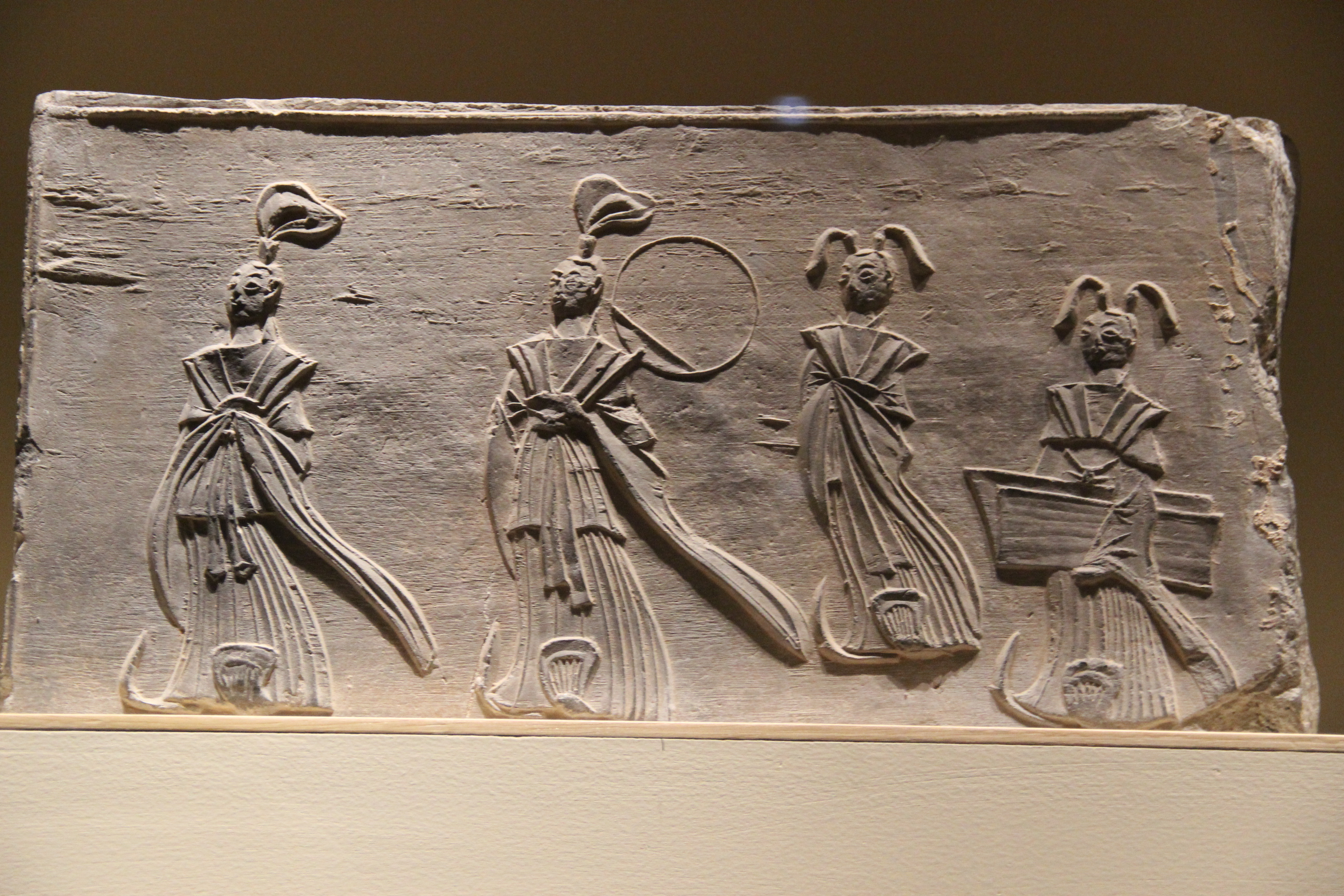
b)

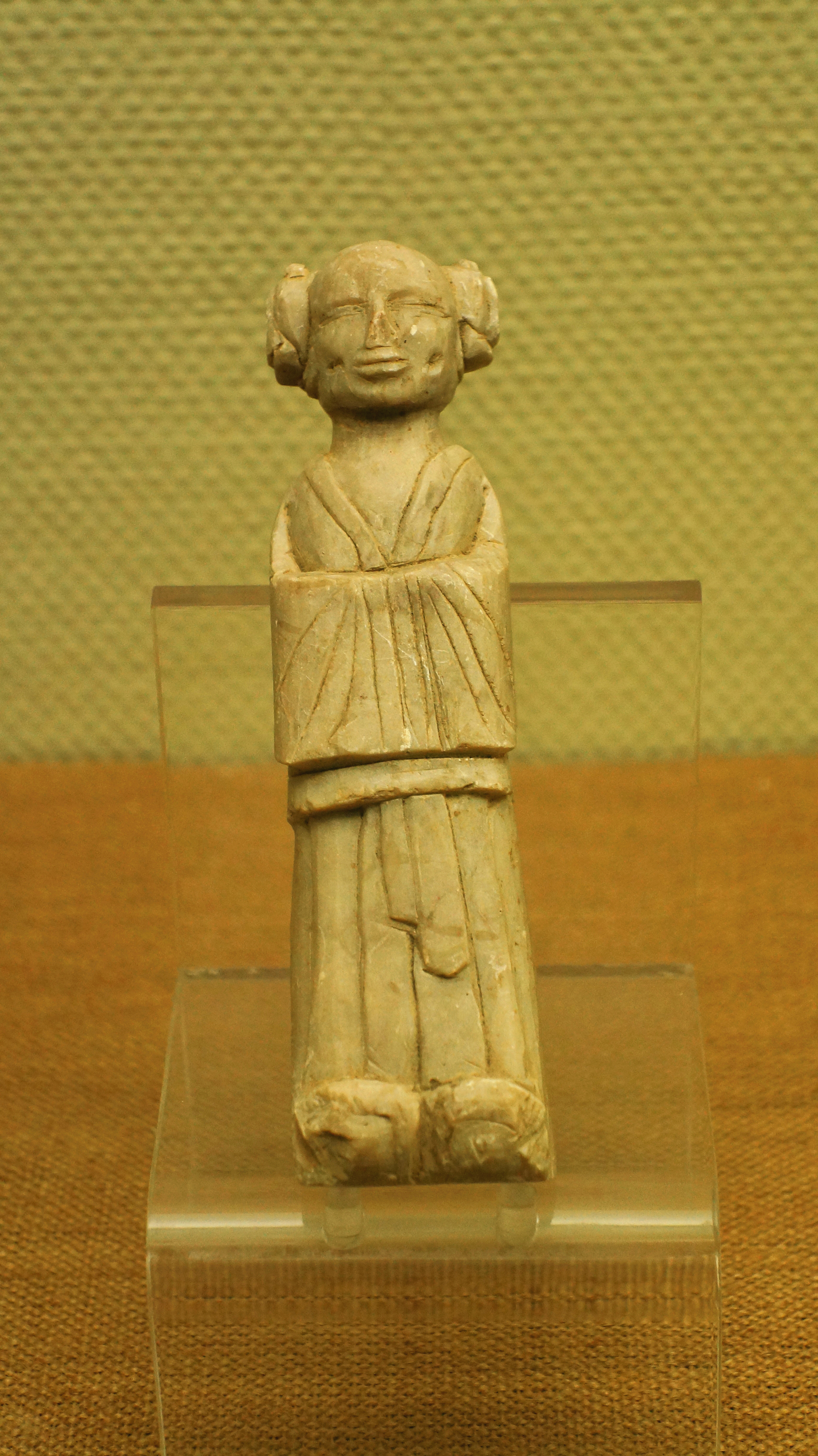
c)

Styles of shanqun: a) shanqun worn like a jiaoling youren yi with less overlap and worn with a weichang, Northern Qi b) shanqun with banbi, Southern dynasties, c) duijin shanqun with shan worn over qun, Southern dynasties

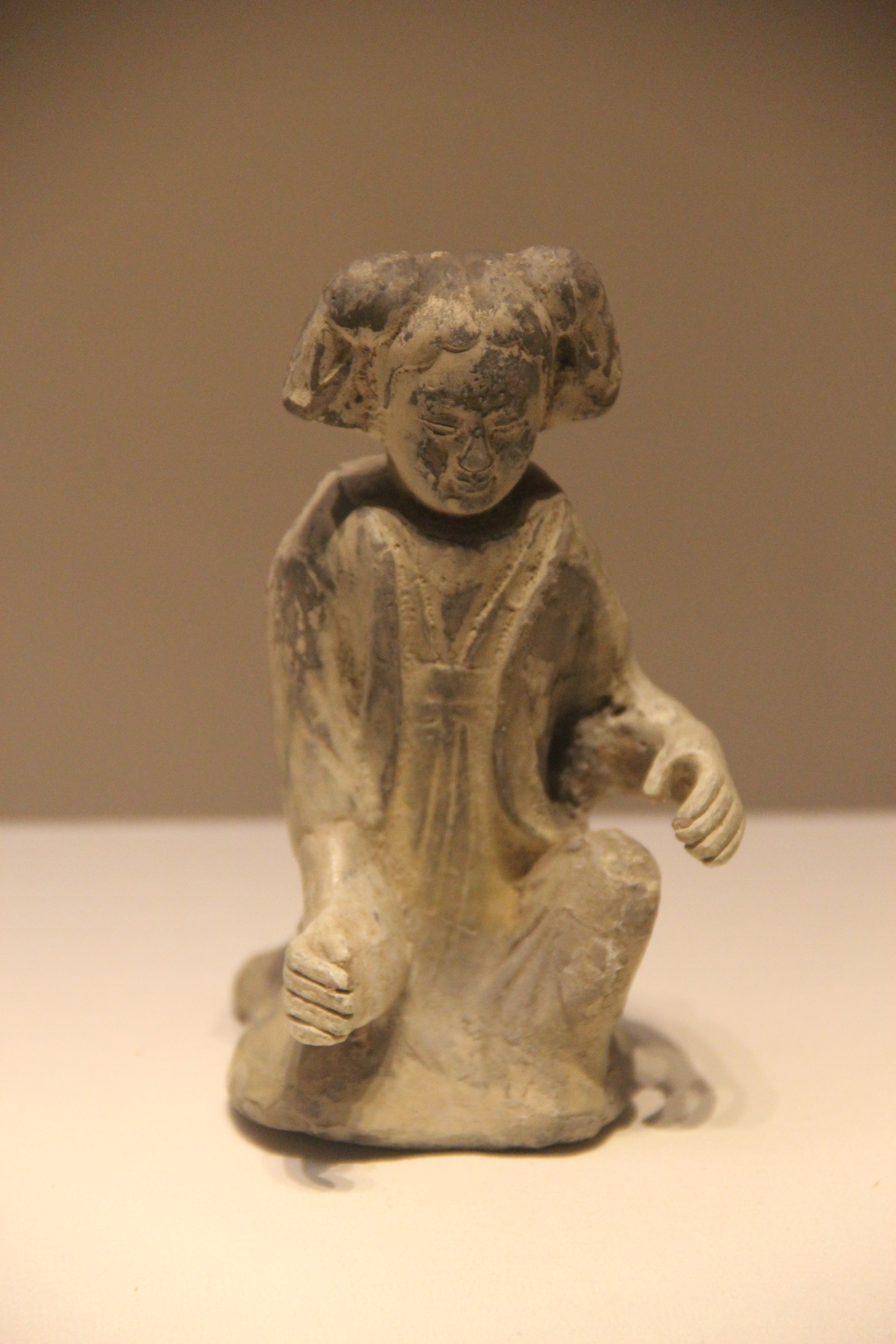
a)

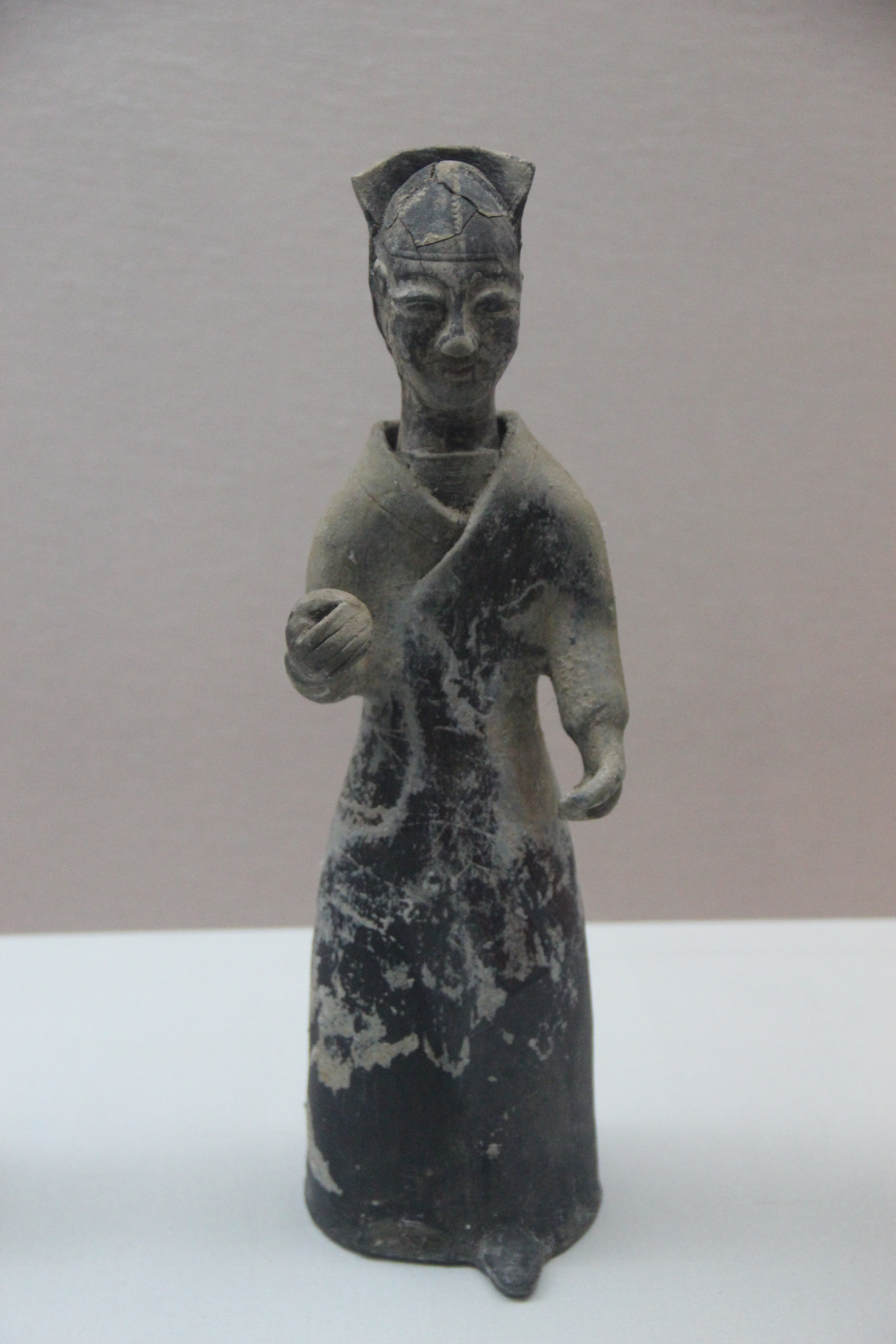
b)

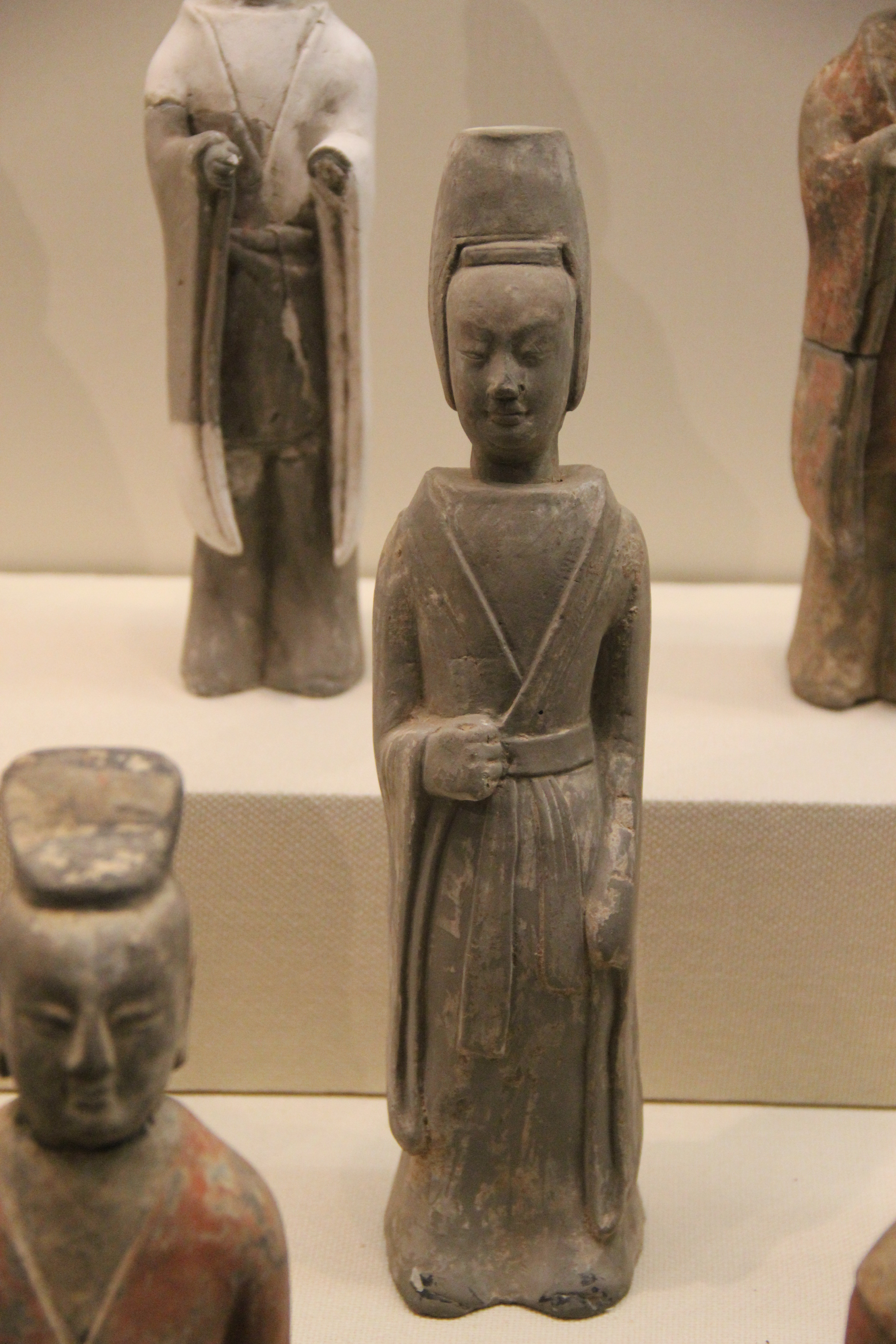
c)

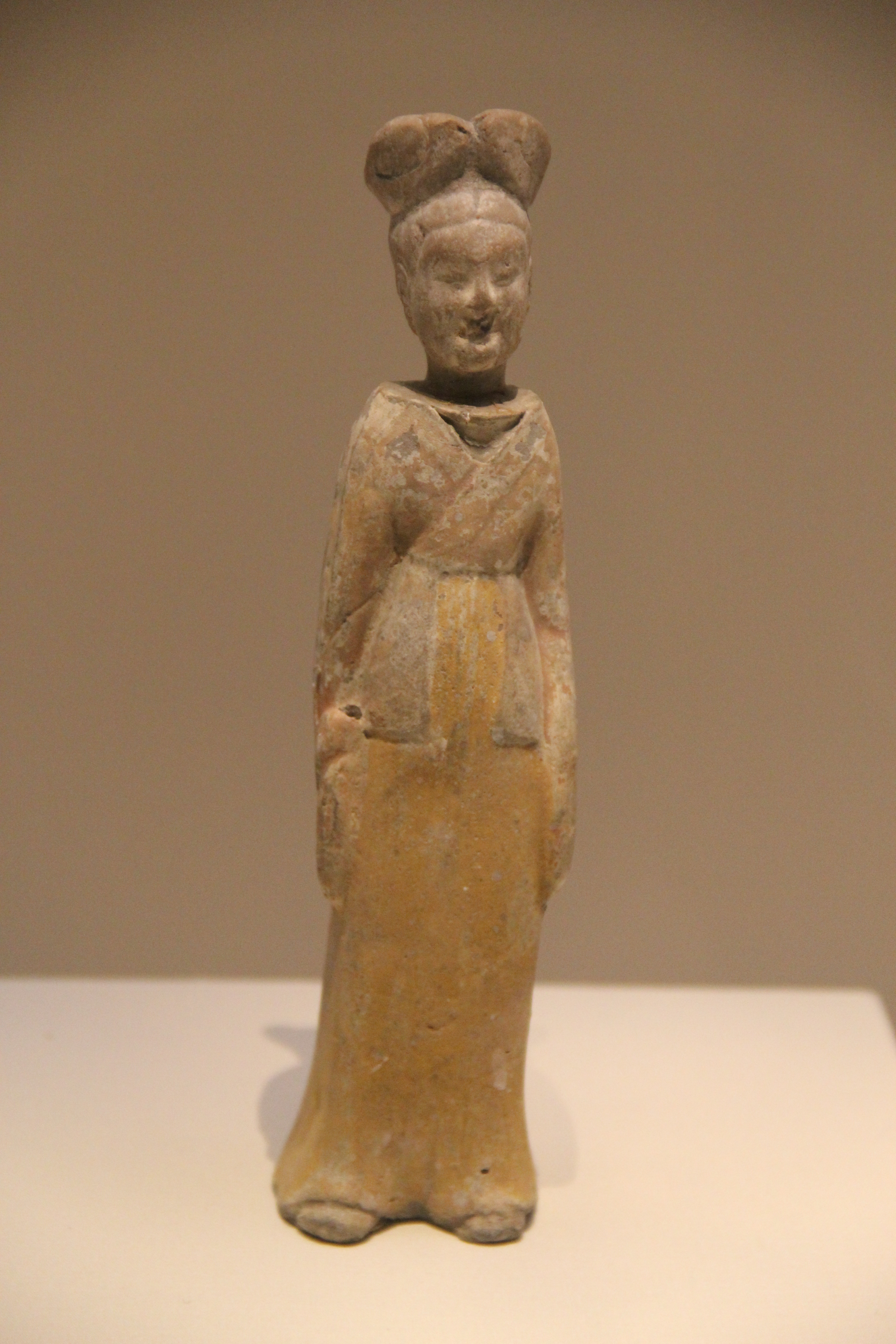
d)

Different styles of ruqun in the Northern and Southern dynasty period a) Qixiong ruqun-style of the Northern dynasties; b) ruqun, Northern dynasties; c) jiaolingruqun with ru under skirt, Northern Qi; d) Ruqun with ru over skirt, Northern Qi

At Luoyang during the Northern Wei dynasty, several variety of clothing styles found on female tomb figures were largely derived from the traditional ruqun-style set of attire. One style of ruqun was the combination of short jacket (usually belted and tied at the front of the jacket) with wide sleeves which falls to the knee or below knee level with a very high waist, pleated and multicoloured long skirt. Based on a female tomb figure dating from the Eastern Wei, this form of ruqun is jacket worn over skirt.

A popular form of ruqun was the jacket worn under skirt. The qixiong ruqun-style also first appeared in the Northern and Southern dynasties.

=== Sui and Tang dynasties ===
In the Sui dynasty, ordinary men did not wear skirts anymore. In the late sixth century, women's skirts in the Sui dynasty were characterized with high waistline; this kind of high waistline skirt created a silhouette which looked similar to the Empire dresses of Napoleonic France; however, the construction of the assemble differed from the ones worn in Western countries as Han Chinese women assemble consisted of a separate skirt and upper garment which show low décolletage. This trend continued in the early decades of the Tang dynasty when women continued the tend of the Sui and would also wear long, high-waist skirts, low-cut upper garment.

During the Sui and Tang dynasty, women wore the ruqun in the qixiong ruqun-style, where the skirts were tied higher and higher up the waist, until they were eventually tied above the breasts and where short upper garment was worn.

In addition to the classical jiaoling ru or shan (crossed collar upper garments), duijin shan (parallel/straight collar upper garments) were also worn in this period, thus exposing the cleavage of the breasts. Some Tang dynasty women skirts had accordion pleats. Red coloured skirts were popular. There was also a skirt called "Pomegranate skirt" for its red colour, and another skirt called "Turmeric skirt" for its yellow colour.

By the Mid-Tang period (around the 8th century), the low cleavage upper garment fell out of fashion; the female beauty ideology changed favouring plump and voluptuous beauty.

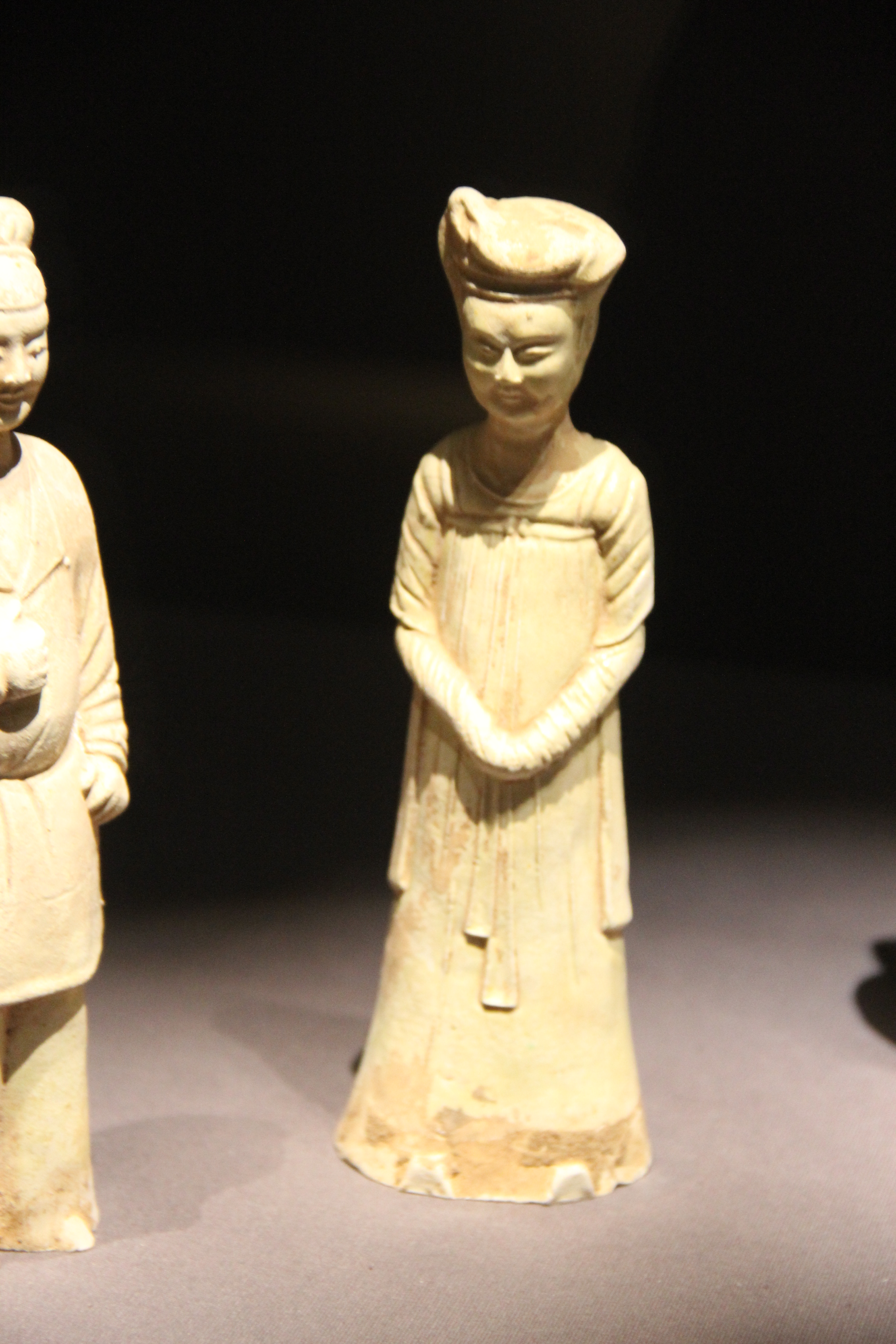
Woman in qixiong ruqun, Sui dynasty.

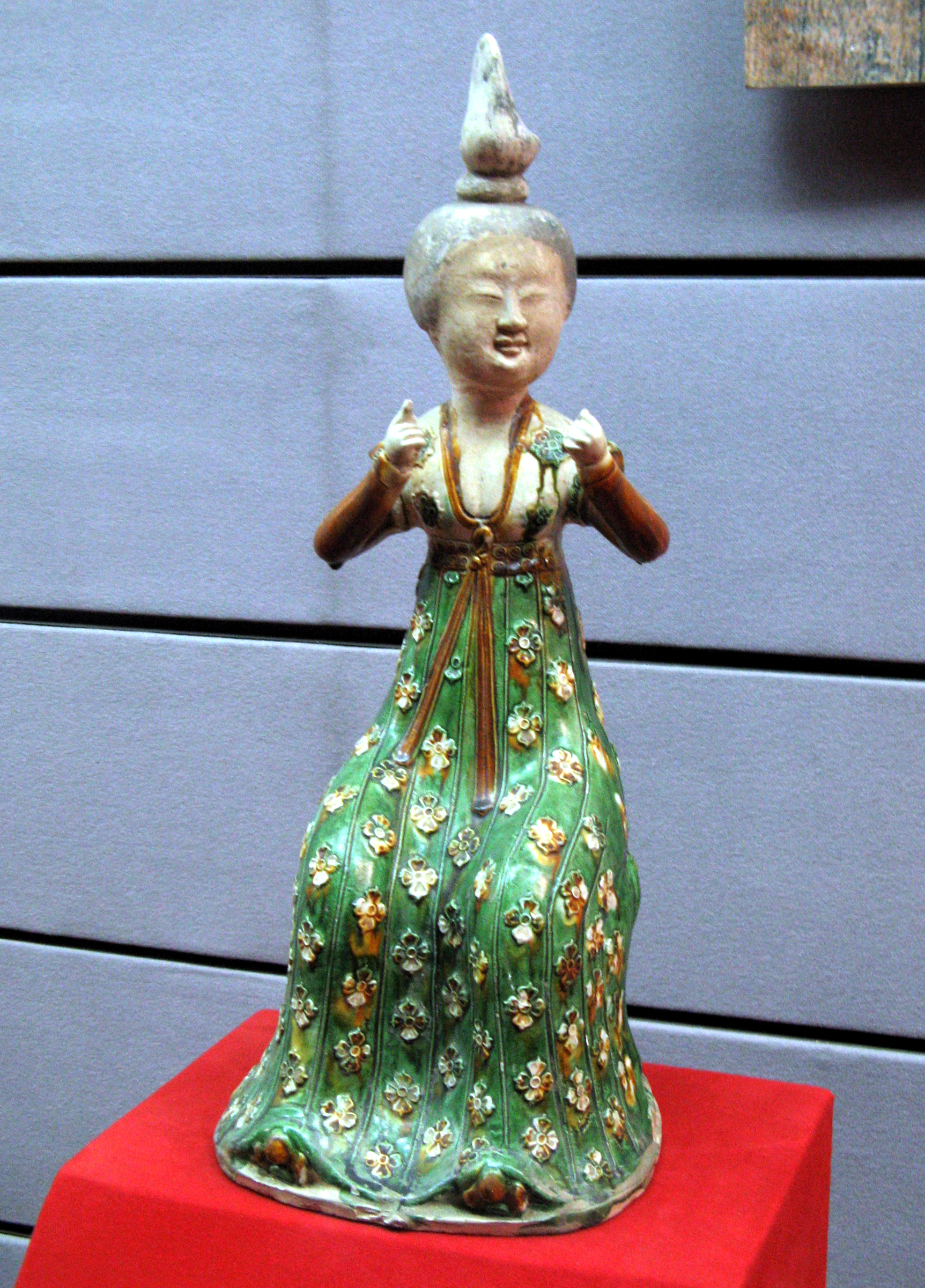

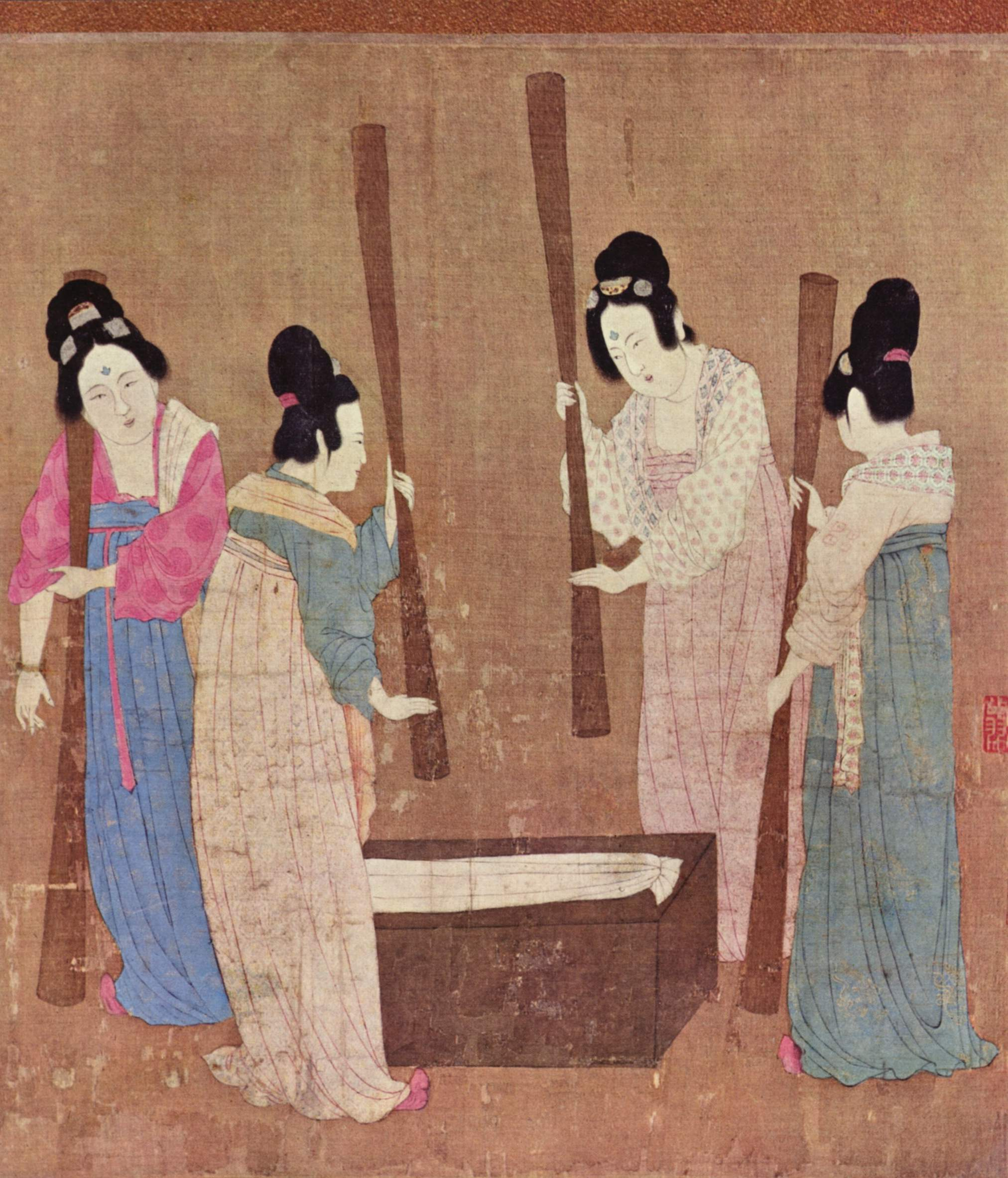
A Tang dynasty painting illustrates women wearing ruqun, with skirts tied above the breasts and short parallel-collar blouses

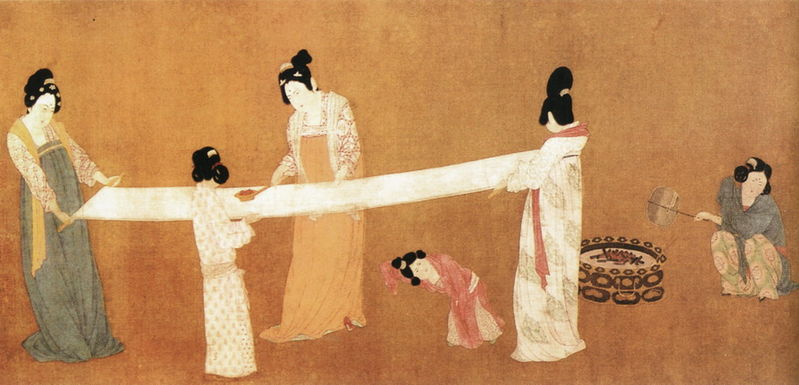
Another Tang dynasty painting illustrating ruqun

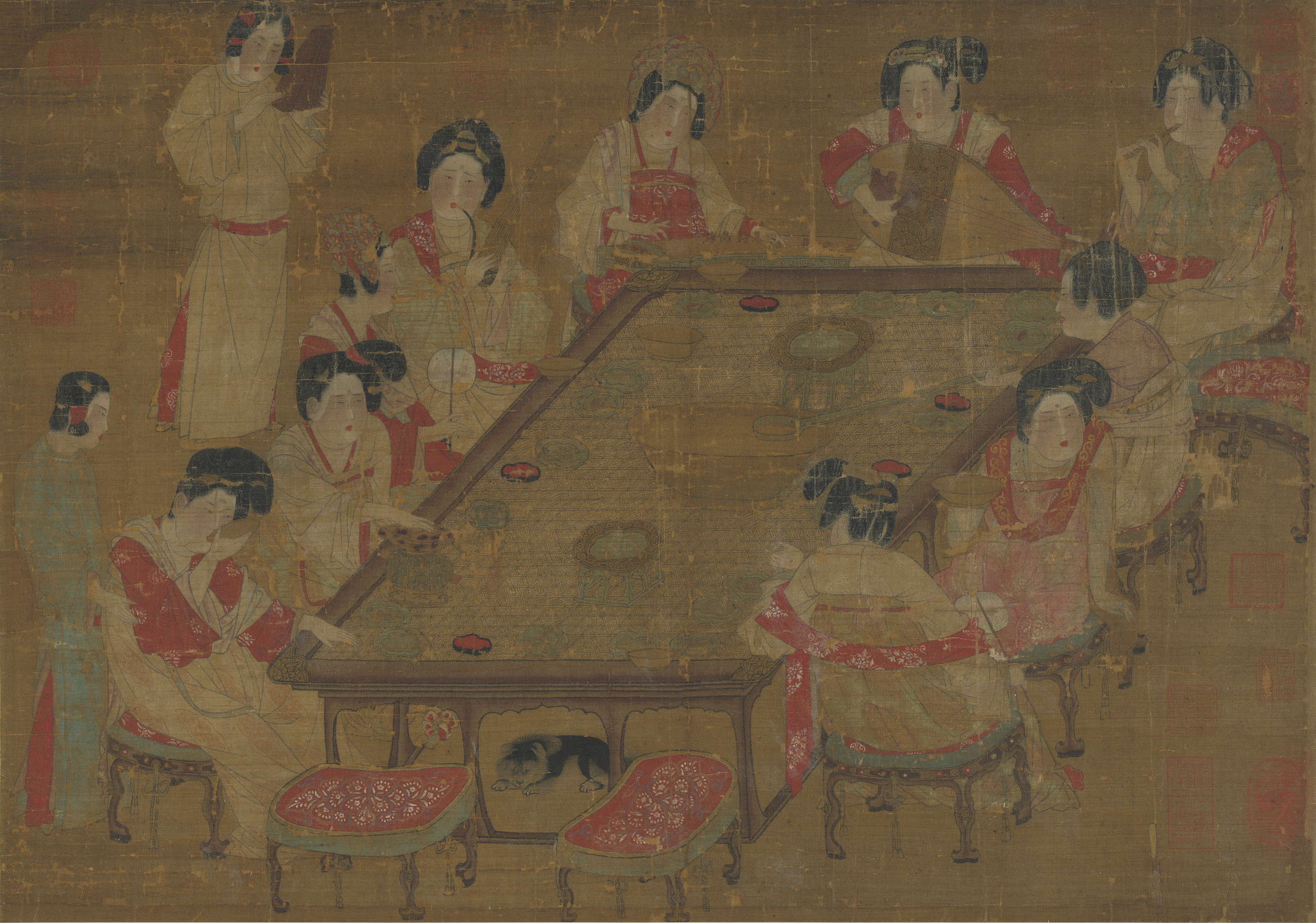
A Tang dynasty palace concert wearing ruqun

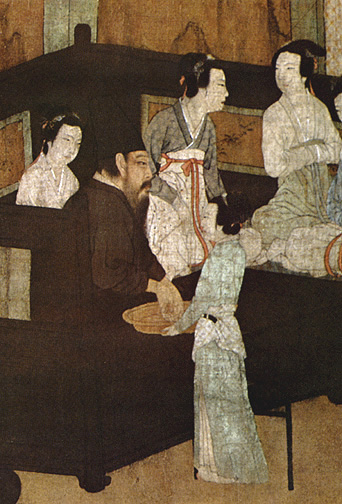

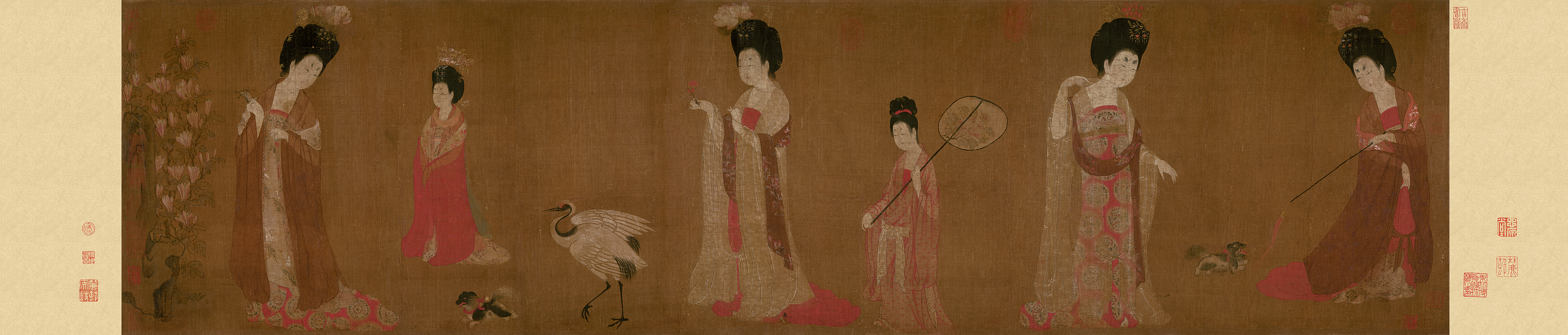

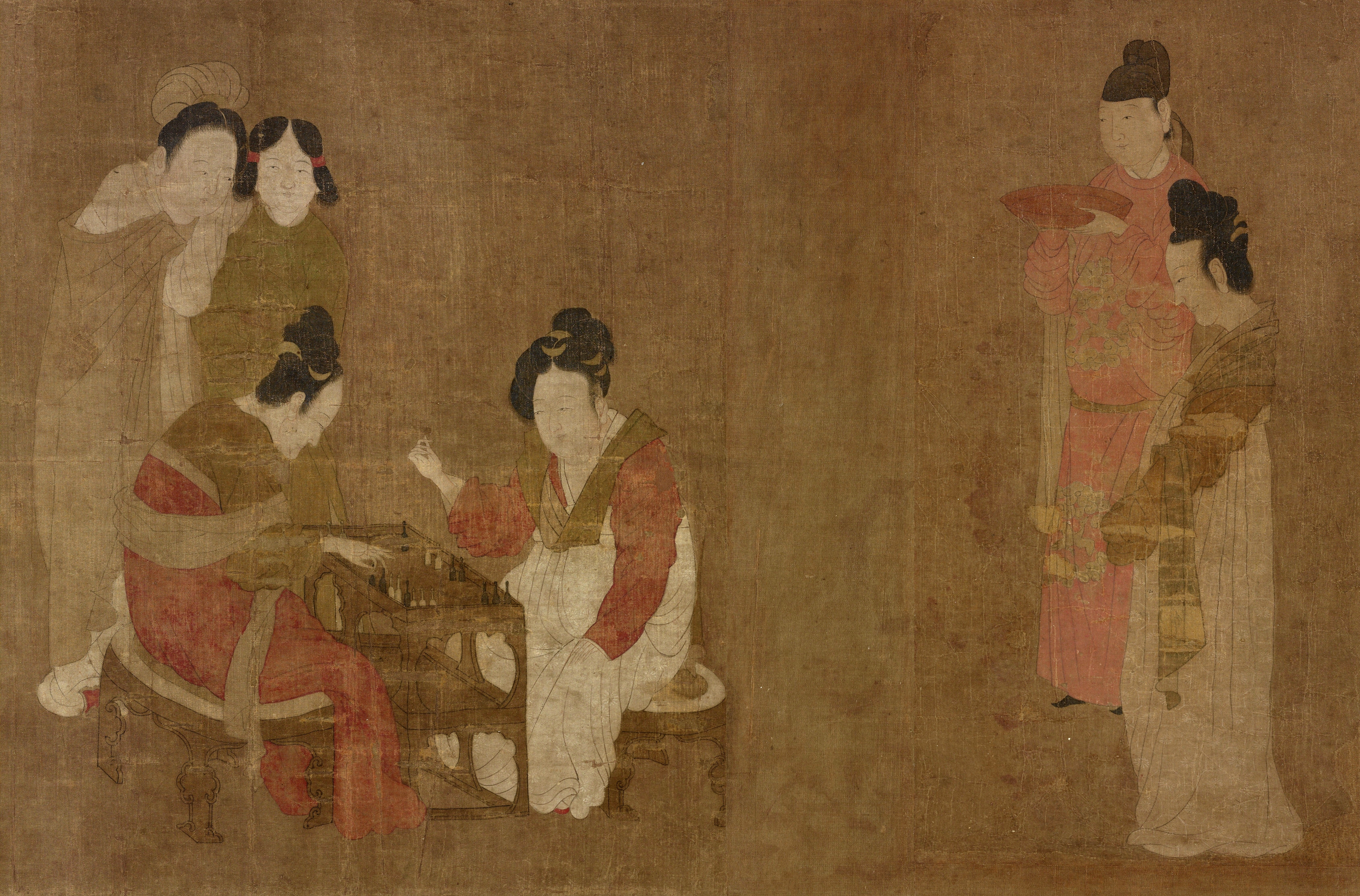

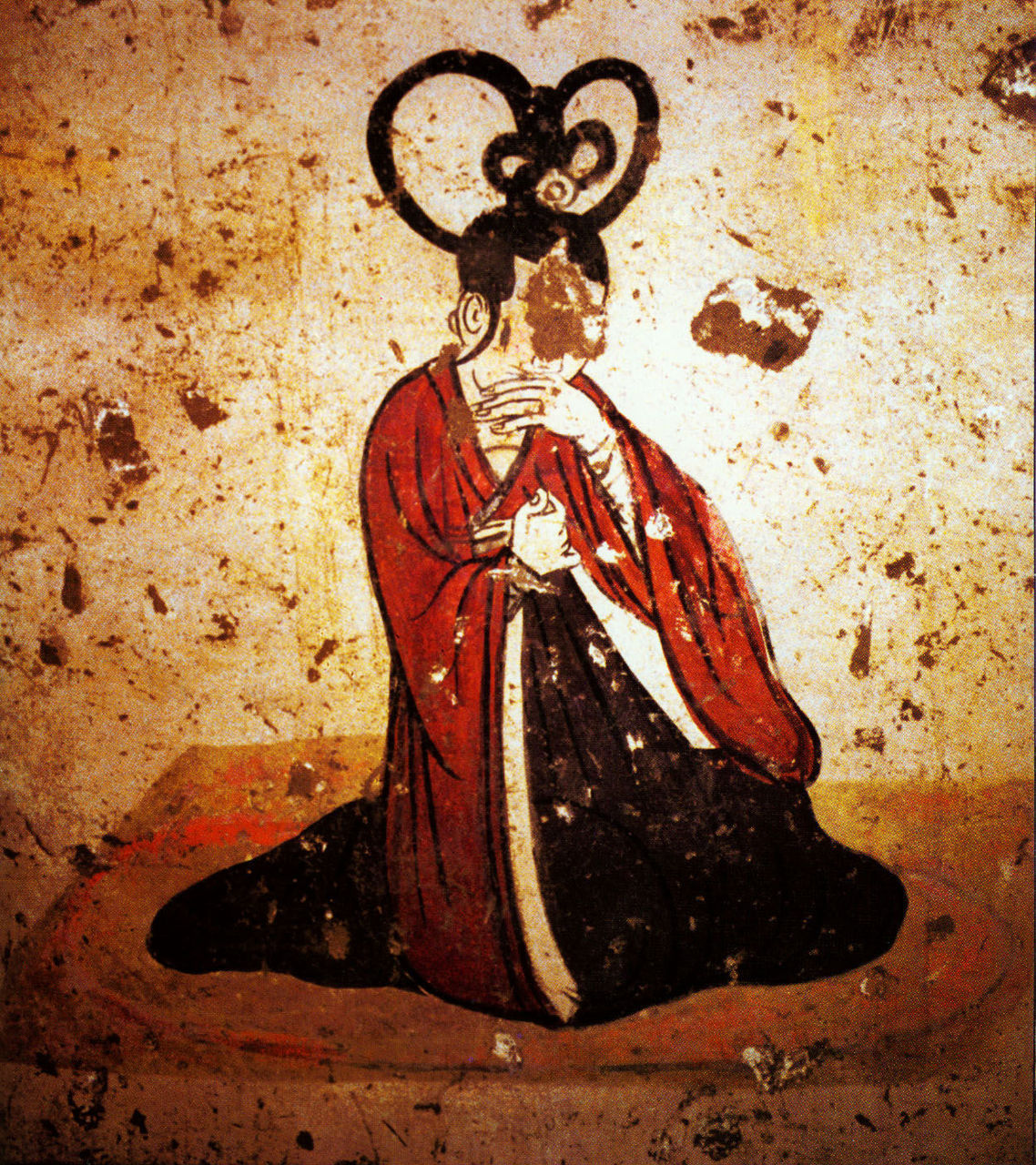

=== Song and Liao dynasties ===
==== Song dynasty ====
Women continued to wear the Tang dynasty's fashion of wearing the upper garment and skirts tied around their breasts until the Song dynasty. In the Song dynasty, the women's skirts were also lowered from the breast level back to the normal waistline. Pleated skirts were introduced and became the main feature of the upper-class women. Song-style ruqun for women consisted of long narrow skirts and jackets which closed to the right. These jackets could be worn over the narrow skirts; this form of ruqun existed in both the Liao dynasty and Song. Cross-collared jackets with narrow sleeves could also be worn under a waist-length skirt or under high-waist skirt.

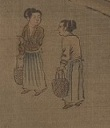
Commoner women wearing ruqun, Song dynasty.

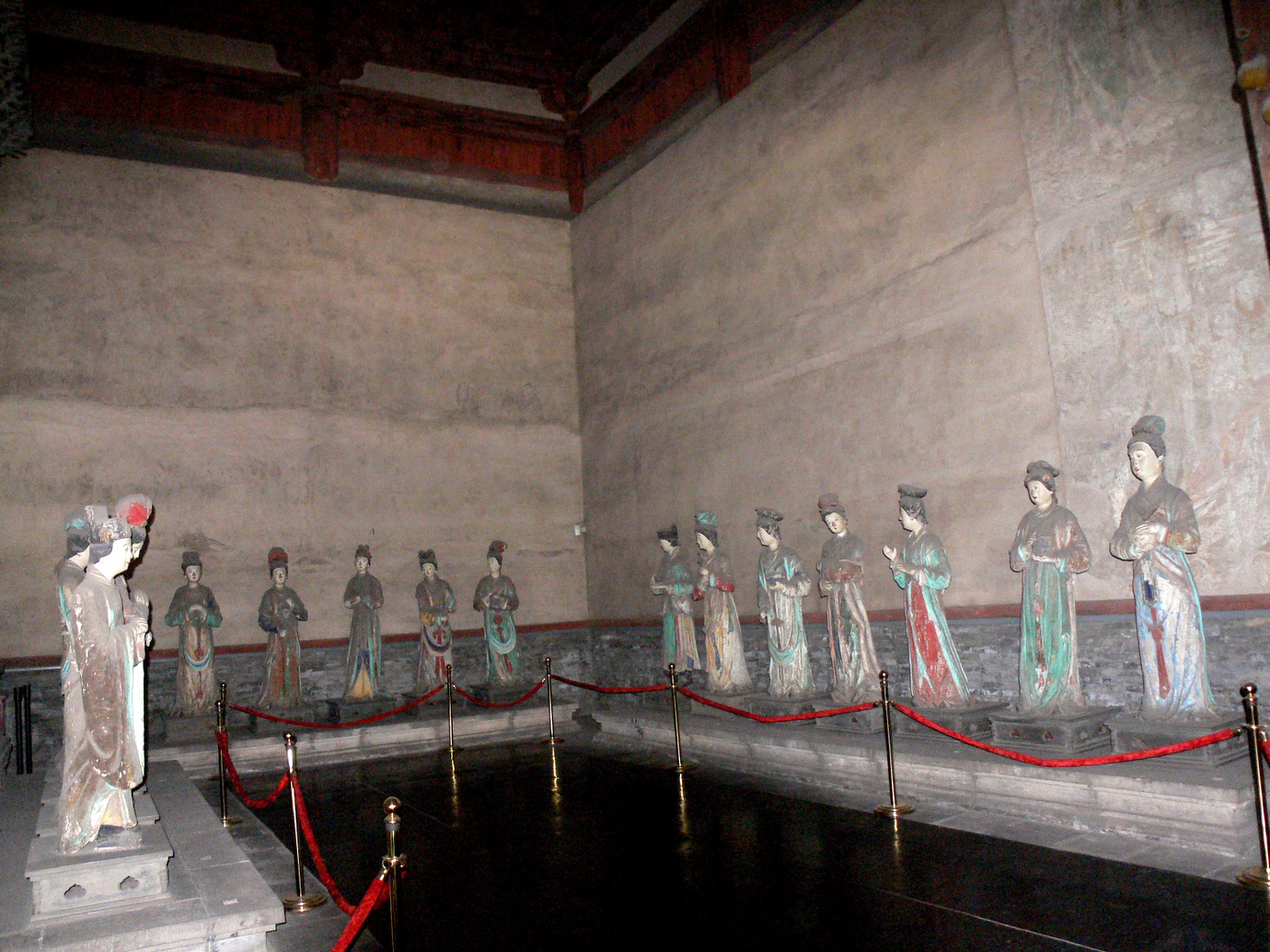
Sculpture of maids wearing ruqun, Song dynasty.

==== Liao dynasty ====
In Liao dynasty, the Song-style and the Tang-style clothing (including the qixiong ruqun) coexisted together; both Khitan women and Han Chinese women in the Liao wore the Han Chinese style Tang-Song dress. Tang-Song style clothing women clothing in Liao also included a long-sleeved, outer jacket with ample sleeves which could cropped or waist-length, was tied with sash in a bow below the breasts to create an empire silhouette. The outer jacket could also be worn over floor-length dress which was worn a yaoqun, a short over-skirt which looked like an apron, on top. In Northern Liao mural tomb depictions, women who are dressed in Han style clothing are depicted in Tang dynasty fashion whereas in the Southern Liao murals, women dressed in Han style clothing are wearing Song-style clothing.

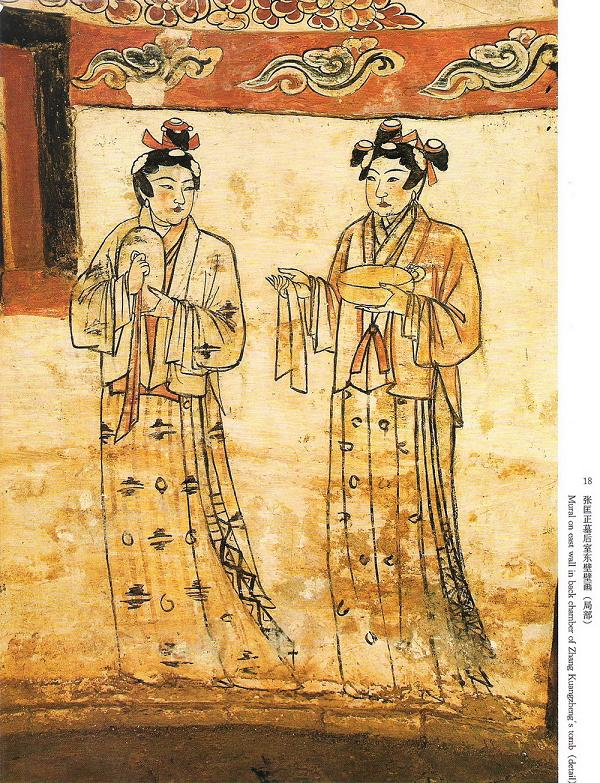
Women possibly wearing shanqun (upper garment over skirt) and beizi (Song-style clothing), inner chamber of the Tomb of Zhang Kuangzheng, Liao dynasty.

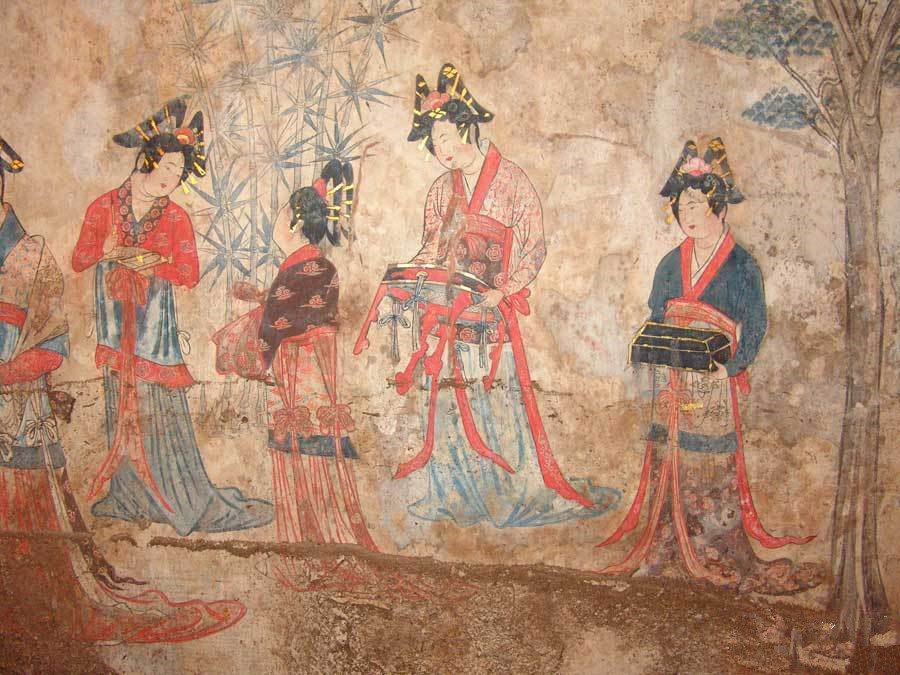
Khitan women wearing Tang-style clothing; Baoshan tomb No.2 wall-painting of Liao dynasty.

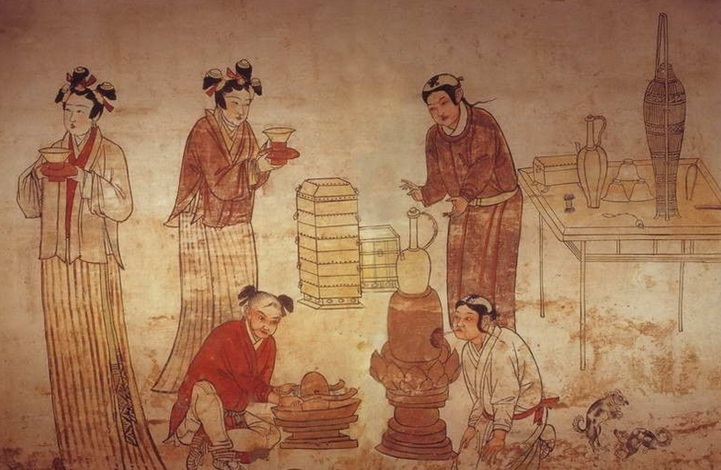
Khitan women wearing Song style ruqun.

=== Yuan dynasty ===
In the Yuan dynasty, the Mongols never imposed Mongol customs on the ethnic Han, and they did not force the Han Chinese to wear Mongol clothing. Many Han Chinese and other ethnicity readily adopted Mongol clothing in Northern China to show their allegiance to the Yuan rulers; however, in Southern China, Mongol clothing was rarely seen as both men and women continued to dress in Song-style garments. Tang-Song style clothing also continued to be worn in multiple layers by families who showed that they were resisting the rule of the Mongols. The Song style dress also continued to persist among the southern elites of the Yuan dynasty and evidence of Song-style clothing was also found in the unearthed tombs in southern China.

The casual clothing for men mainly followed the dress code of the Han people and they wore banbi as a casual clothing item while ordinary women clothing consisted of banbi and ruqun.

Chinese women also wore cross-collar upper garment which had elbow length sleeves (i.e. cross-collar banbi) over a long-sleeved blouse under a skirt; the abbreviated wrap skirts were also popular in Yuan. Women jackets closing to the right and closing to the left coexisted in the Yuan dynasty. It was also common for Chinese women in the Yuan dynasty to close their clothing to the left side (instead of the right side).

The way of wearing short-length cross-collar upper garment over long narrow skirt was also a Song-style fashion. Long cross-collar upper garment (about the knee-length) over a long skirt could also be worn by Chinese elite women. The aoqun consisting of jia ao (夹袄), a lined jacket, and a long-length qun was worn by the Han Chinese women as winter clothing; typically the jia ao would be worn over the skirt.

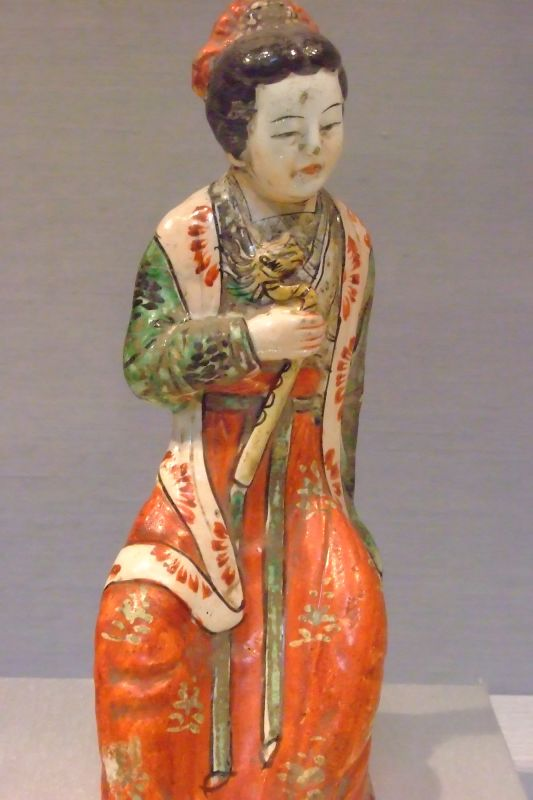
Figure of a Woman Jin-Yuan dynasty China 13th-14th century.

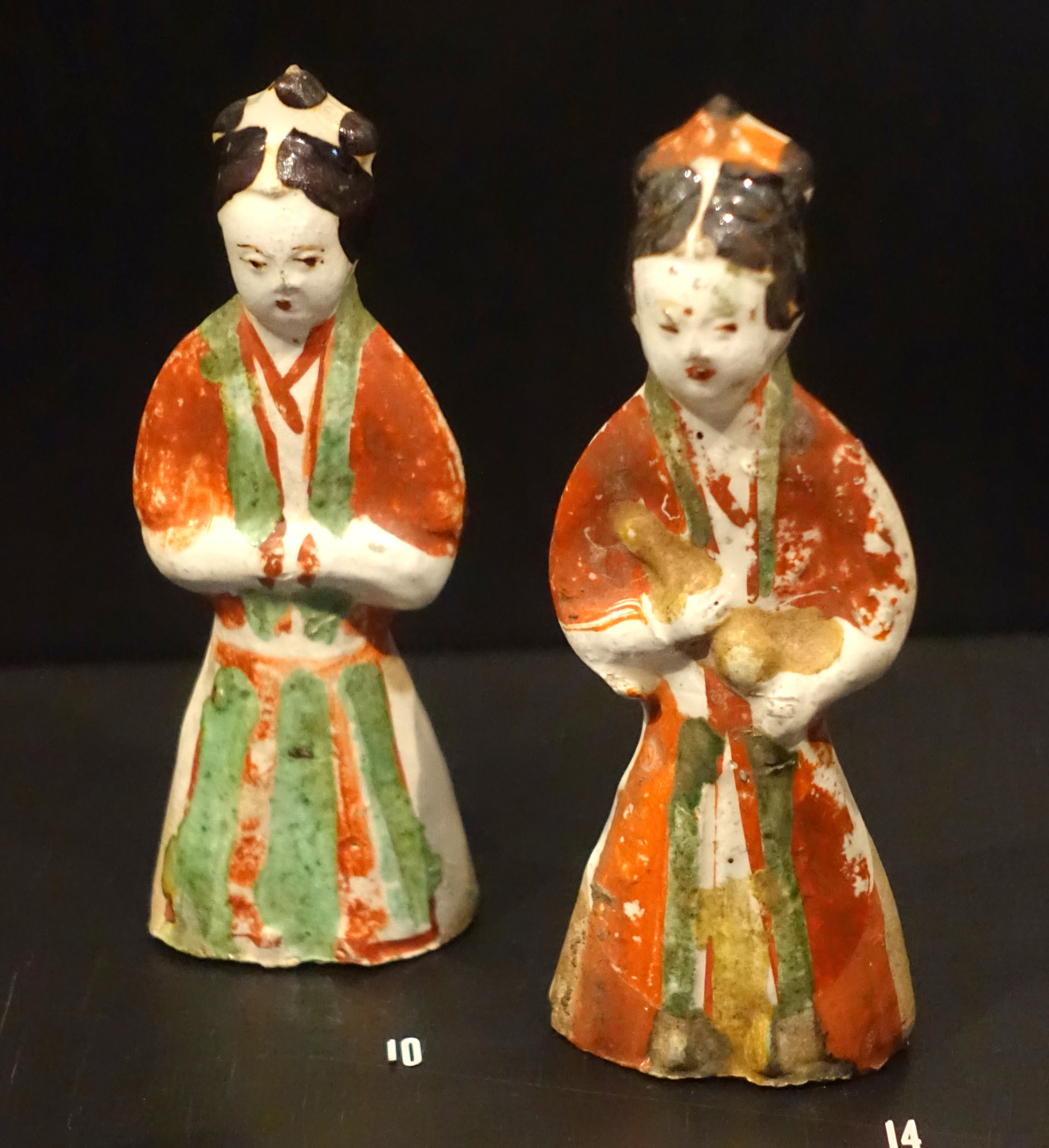
Ruqun and banbi, Yuan dynasty. The jacket is closing to the left which is a common style for Chinese women in the Yuan dynasty.

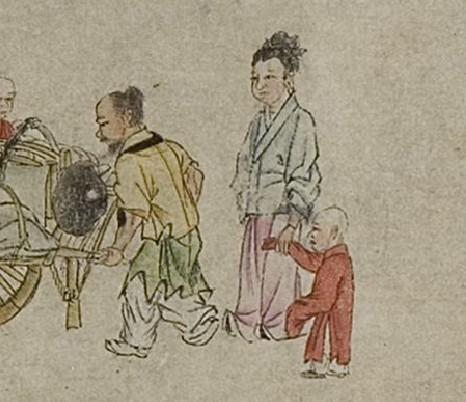
Woman wearing shanqun, Yuan dynasty.

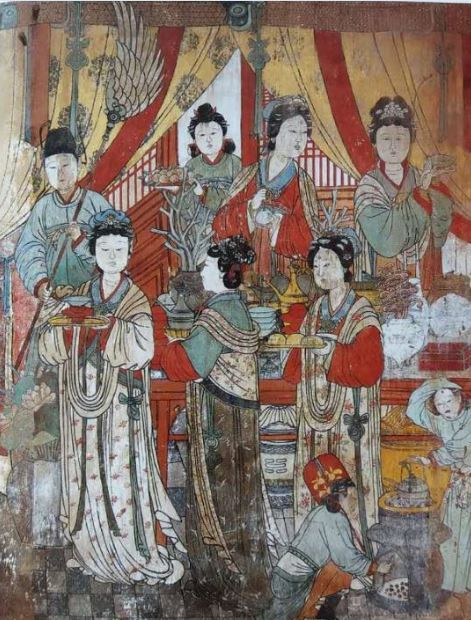
Women depicted in the Fresco in the Hall of King Mingying. Han women wore elbow-length sleeves, cross-collar upper garment over a long-sleeved blouse; the abbreviated skirts were popular in Yuan.

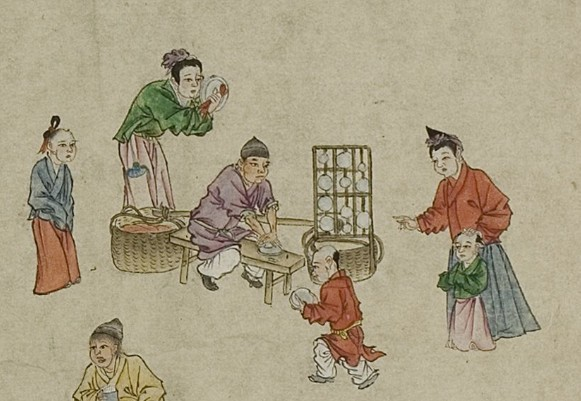
Women wearing Song-style ruqun (jacket over skirt) in the Yuan dynasty, from the painting 太平風會圖; "Street Scenes in Times of Peace", Yuan dynasty 14th century.

=== Ming dynasty ===
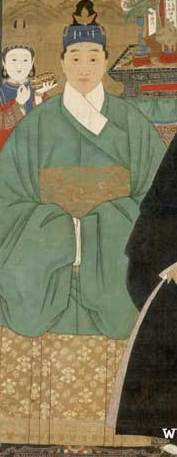
A woman wearing a jacket (ao) which closes on the left, an atypical feature, Ming dynasty portrait.

In terms of appearance, the Ming dynasty ruqun (i.e. the short jacket and skirt) was similar to the Song dynasty's ruqun. Compared to the ruqun worn in the Tang dynasty, the Ming dynasty ruqun was more gentle and elegant in style; it was also less lavish and yet less rigid and strict as the ruqun worn in the Song dynasty. One difference from the Song dynasty ruqun is the addition of a small short waist skirt which was worn by young maidservants; it is assumed that it was worn as an apron to protect the long skirt under it. The short overskirt was called yaoqun. Moreover, following the Yuan dynasty, the style of closing the jacket to the left in women's clothing persisted in some geographical areas of the Ming dynasty, or for at least Chinese women who lived in the province of Shanxi. Ming dynasty portrait paintings showing Chinese women dressing in left lapel jackets appeared to be characteristic of ancestral portraits from the province of Shanxi and most likely in the areas neighbouring the province.

By the Ming dynasty, the ruqun became the most common form of attire for women. The sleeves of the blouse were mostly curved with a narrow sleeve cuff in a style known as pipaxiu (琵琶袖; 'pipa sleeve'). The collar was of the same colour as the clothing. Often, there was an optional detachable protective huling (護領; 'protect collar') sewn to the collar. The huling can be white or any dark colour, and is used to protect the collar from being rotten by sweat, therefore to extend the life of the clothing. Towards the start of the Qing dynasty, the skirt was mostly baizhequn (百摺裙; 'hundred pleat skirt') or mamianqun.

By the late Ming dynasty, the aoqun (jacket over skirt) became more prevalent than the ruqun (short jacket under skirt); and the ao became longer in length. By the late Ming dynasty, jackets with high collars started to appear. The stand-up collar were closed with interlocking buttons made of gold and silver, called zimukou (子母扣). The appearance of interlocking buckle promoted the emergence and the popularity of the stand-up collar and the Chinese jacket with buttons at the front, and laid the foundation of the use of Chinese knot buckles. In women garments of the Ming dynasty, the stand-up collar with gold and silver interlocking buckles became one of the most distinctive and popular form of clothing structure; it became commonly used in women's clothing reflecting the conservative concept of Ming women's chastity by keeping their bodies covered and due to the climate changes during the Ming dynasty (i.e. the average temperature was low in China).

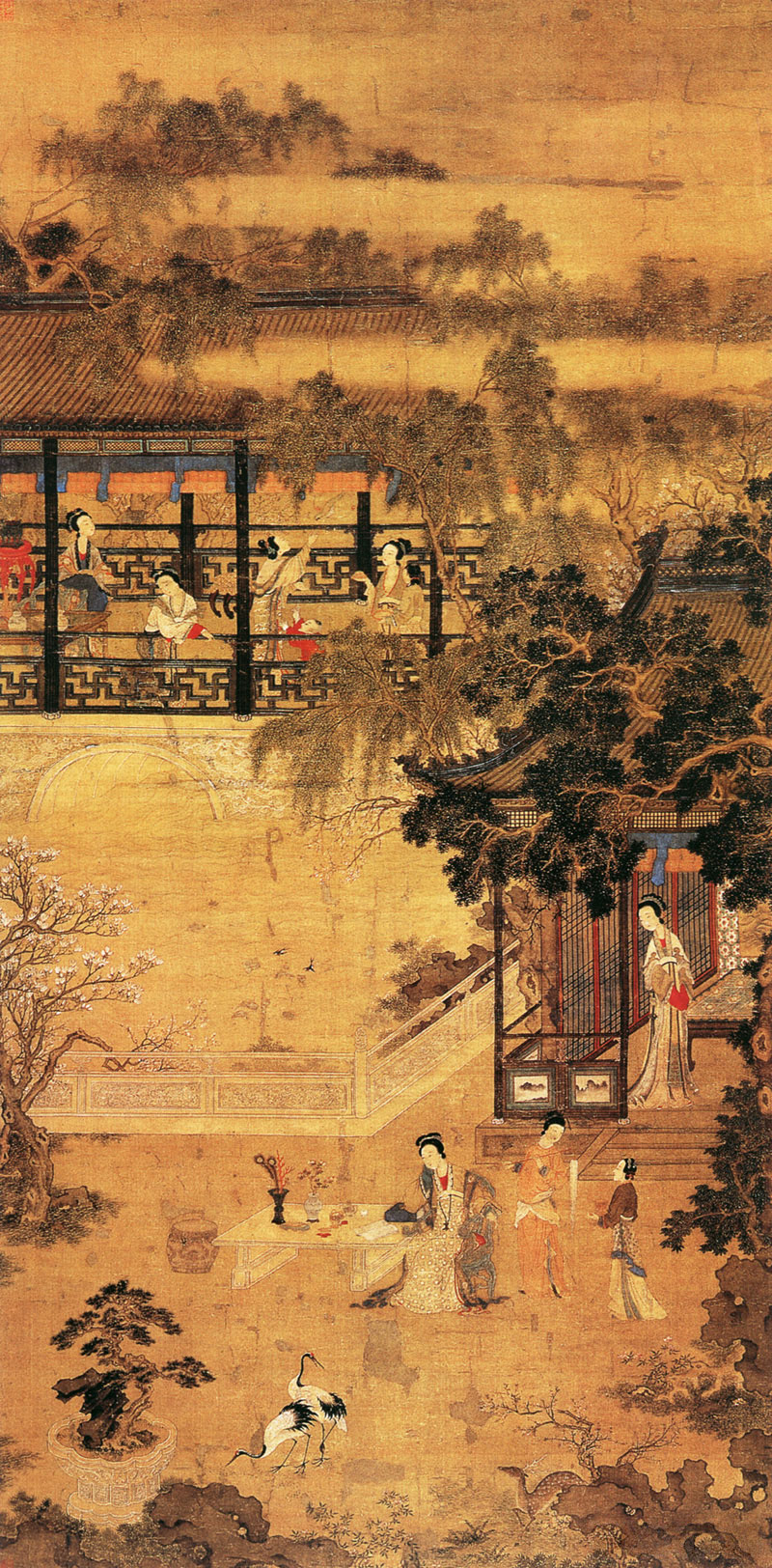
A painting by Ming dynasty painter Tang Yin illustrating women in ruqun

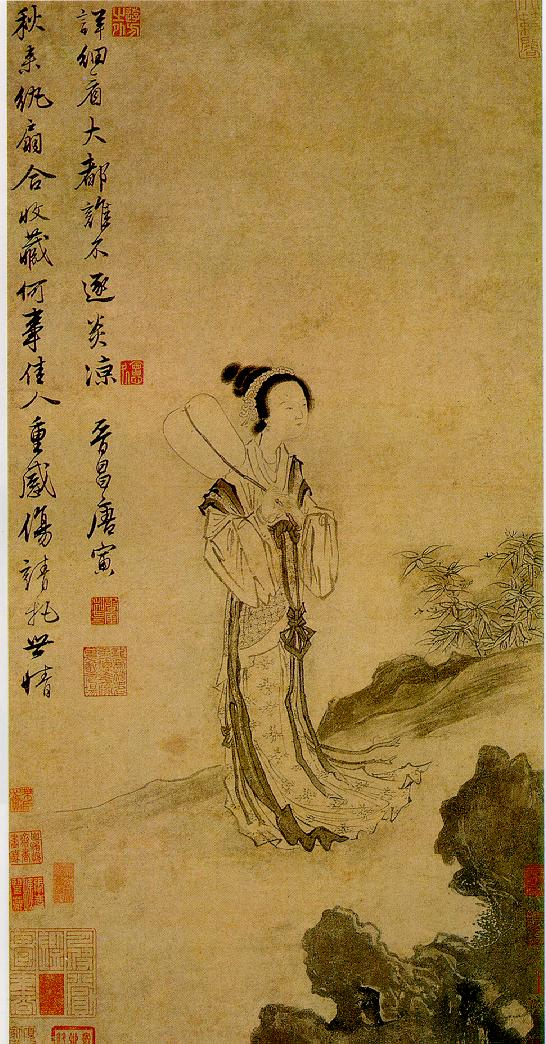
A painting by Ming dynasty painter Tang Yin illustrating women in ruqun

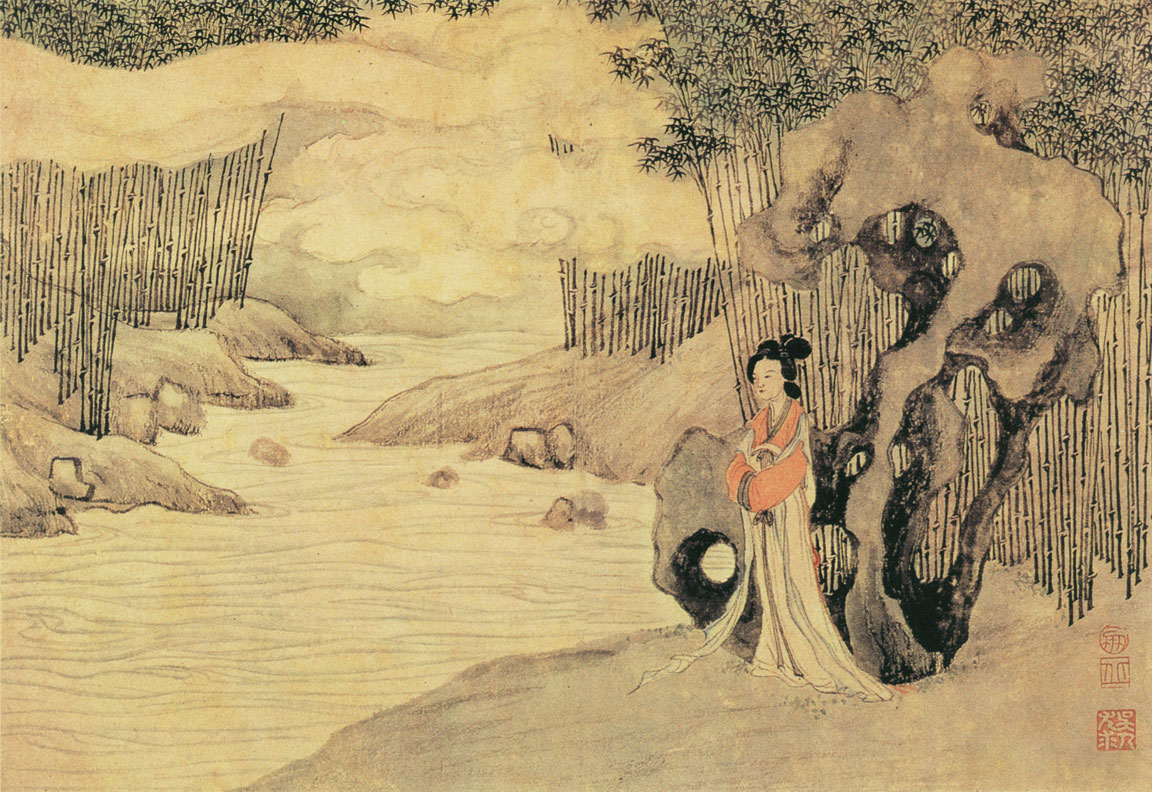
A painting by Ming dynasty painter Tang Yin illustrating women in ruqun

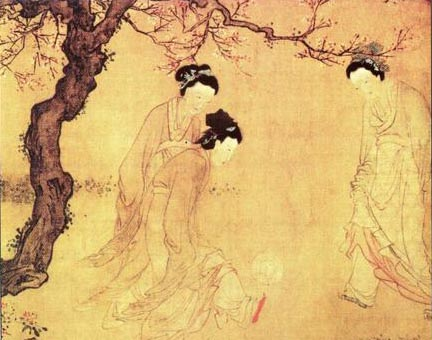
Illustration of Ming dynasty ruqun

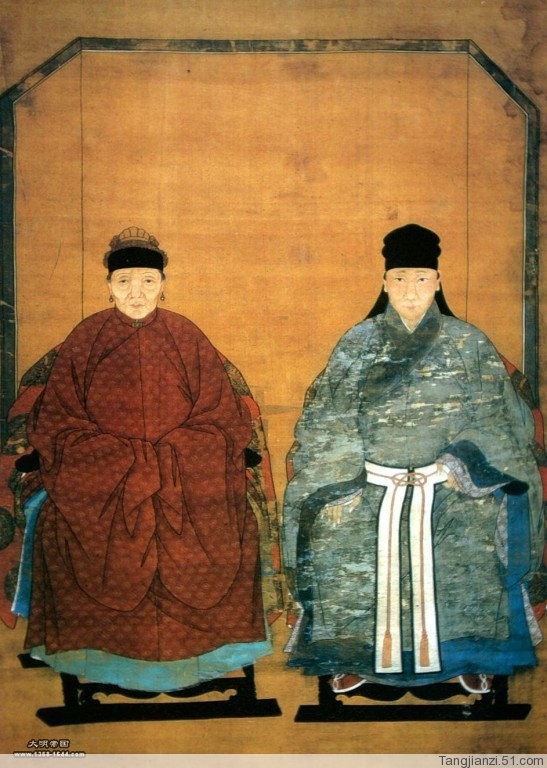
A woman (left) wearing an aoqun (i.e. top over skirt), Ming dynasty.

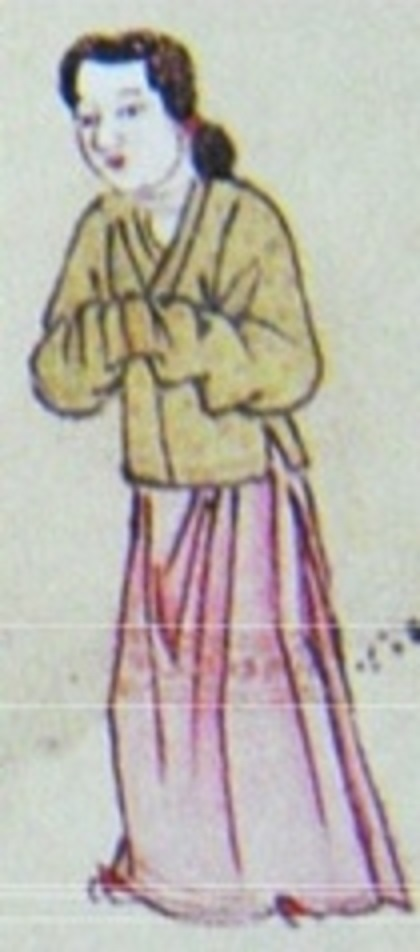
Aoqun, Ming dynasty.

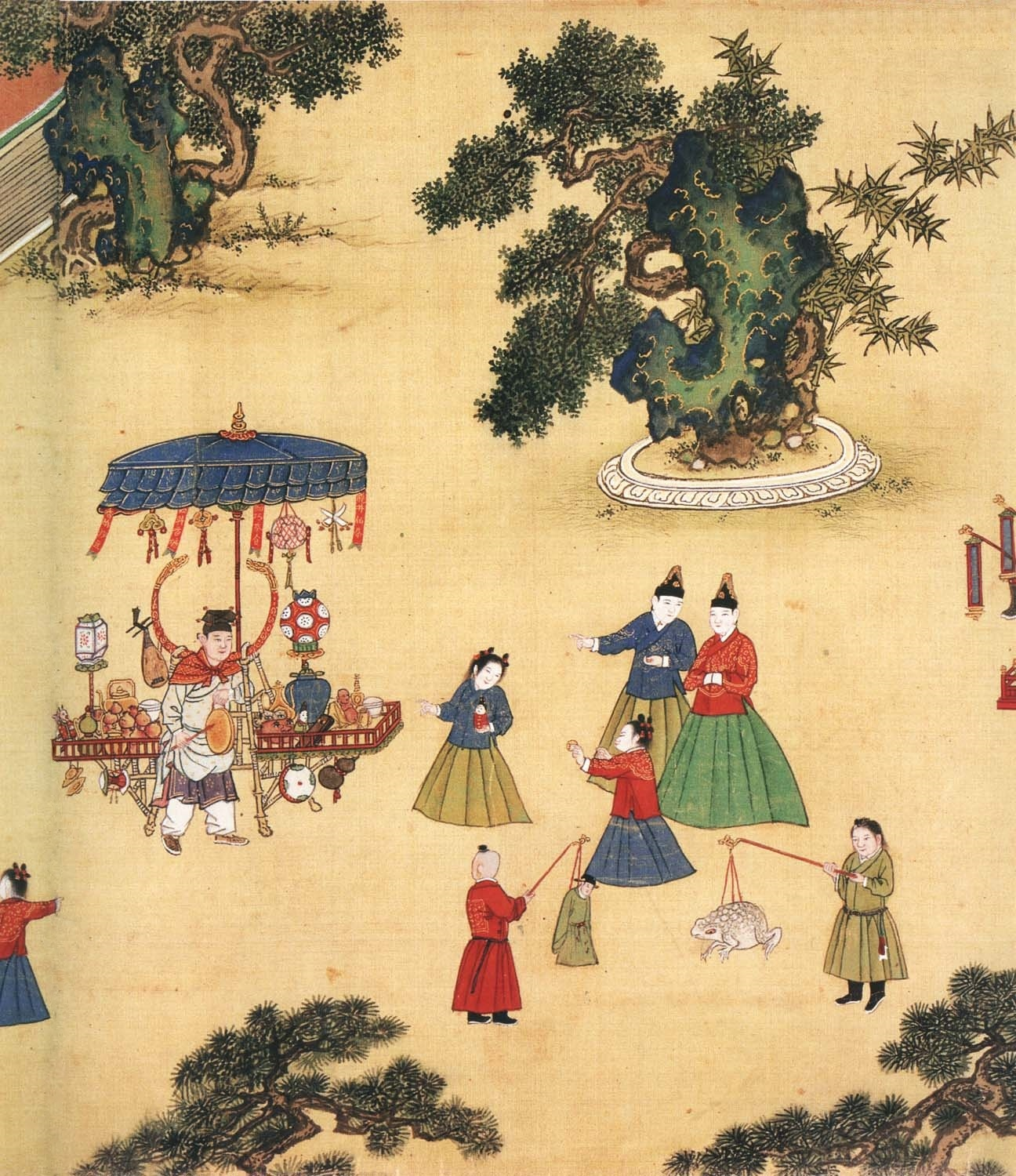
Group of women wearing aoqun, Ming dynasty

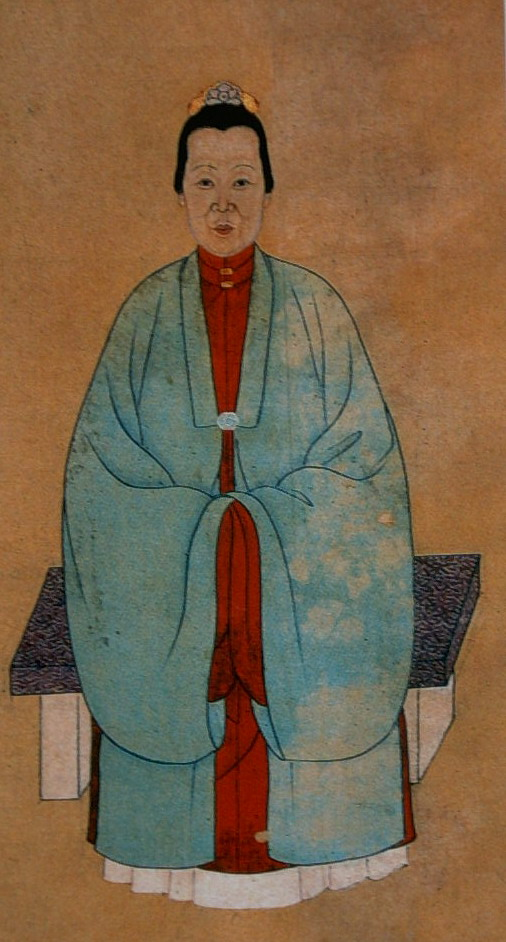
A ming dynasty woman wearing a chang ao over a skirt (possibly a mamian skirt). A blue pifeng is worn over the outfit. The ao jacket is long and has a high stand-up collar.

=== Qing dynasty ===
During the Qing dynasty, the aoqun was the most prominent clothing of Han Chinese women. The ruqun (i.e. short jacket under skirt) continued to be worn in early Qing dynasty, but the later Qing dynasty depictions of ruqun in arts were mostly based on earlier paintings rather than the lived clothing worn by women in this period.

In the late Qing, women wore the long jacket ao with the skirt. It was fashionable to wear the ao (袄) with the baizhequn (百摺裙) and the mamianqun. The ao in the Qing dynasty has a front centre closure and then curves crossover to the right before secured with frog buttons. The front closing, collar, hem, and sleeves cuff have edging of contrasting pipings and side slits. The skirts have a flat front and back panels with knife-pleated sides. In Qing, the high collar continued to be used but it was not a common feature in clothing before the 20th century. In the late Qing, the high collar become more popular and was integrated to the jacket and robe of the Chinese and the Manchu becoming a regular garment feature instead of an occasional feature. The high collar remained a defining feature of their jacket even in the first few years of the republic.

For the Han Chinese women, the stand-up collar became a defining feature of their long jacket; this long jacket with high collar could be worn over their trousers (shanku) but also over their skirts. In The Chinese and Japanese repository published in 1863 by James Summers, Summers described Chinese women wearing a knee-length upper garment which fits closely at the neck; they wore it together with loose trousers with border around the ankles under a skirt, which opens at the front and has large plaits over the hips. Summers also observed that the sleeves of the women's garment are generally long enough to conceal the hands in cold weather; the sleeves were sometimes very wide and were decorated beautifully with embroidered satin lining which would be turned back to form a border. In Mesny's Chinese Miscellany written in 1897 by William Mesny, it was observed that skirts were worn by Chinese women over their trousers in some regions of China, but that in most areas, skirts were only used when women would go out for paying visits. He also observed that the wearing of trousers was a national custom for Chinese women and that trousers were worn in their homes when they would do house chores. Mesny also observed that men (especially farmers, working men and soldiers) around Shanghai also wore skirts in winter.

Another form of ruqun worn in that period is called qungua (裙褂), which is composed of gua (褂; "a jacket with central button closure") worn with a qun (裙) skirt. The gua jacket was a popular form of jacket in Qing and was worn as a summer jacket instead of the ao which was usually worn in winter. The qungua also referred to one style of Qing dynasty wedding dress.

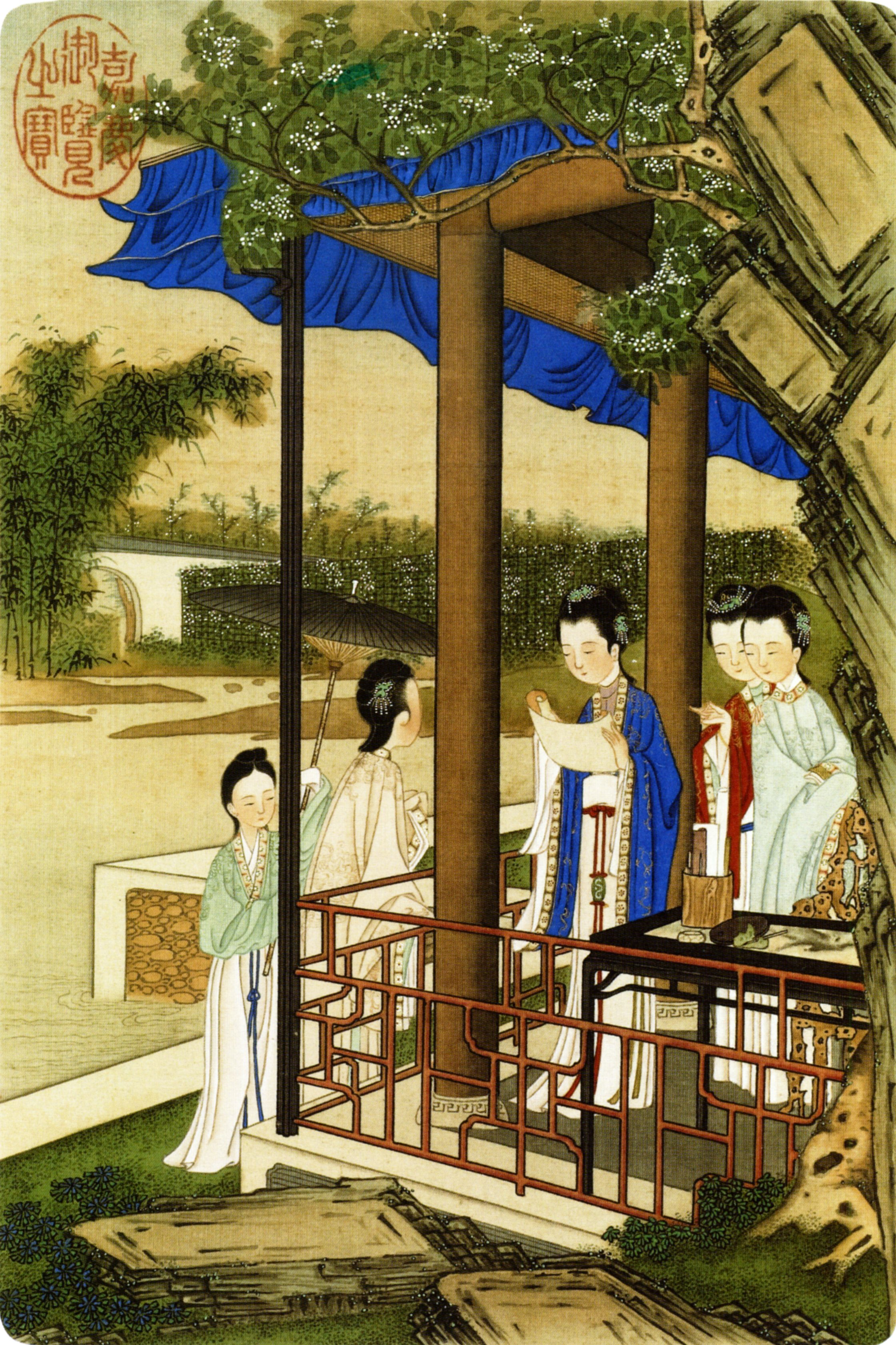
Illustration of ruqun and pifeng during Qing dynasty

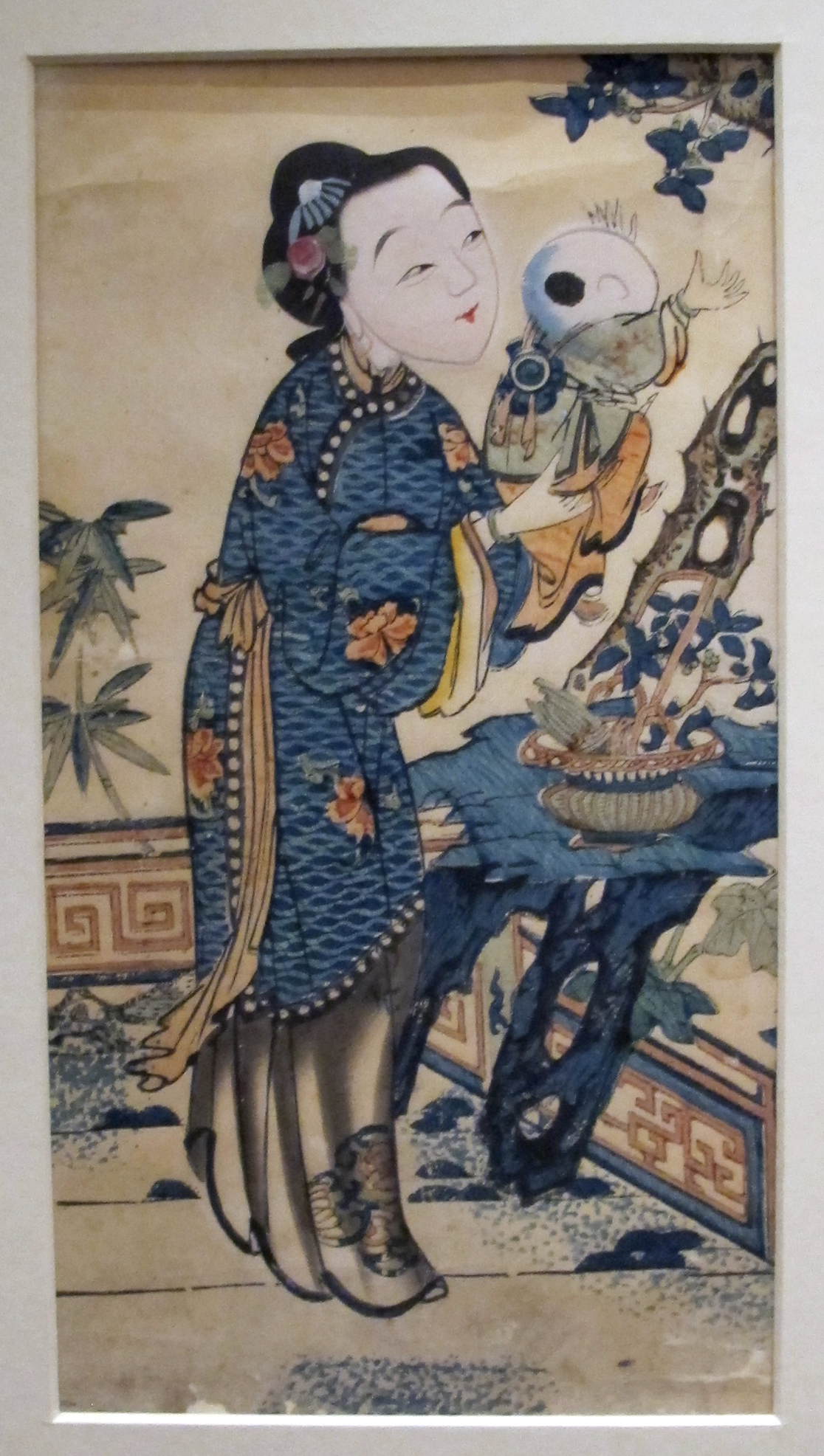
Qing dynasty aoqun, the blue ao (jacket) has a slanted/curved opening.

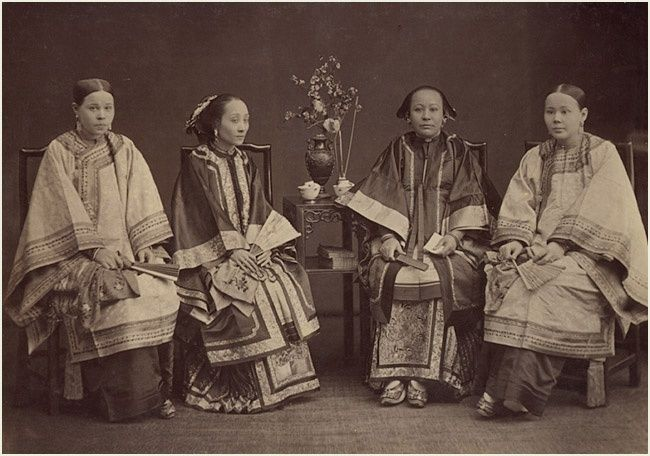
Qing dynasty Han Chinese women wearing Manchu-influenced aoqun and qungua.

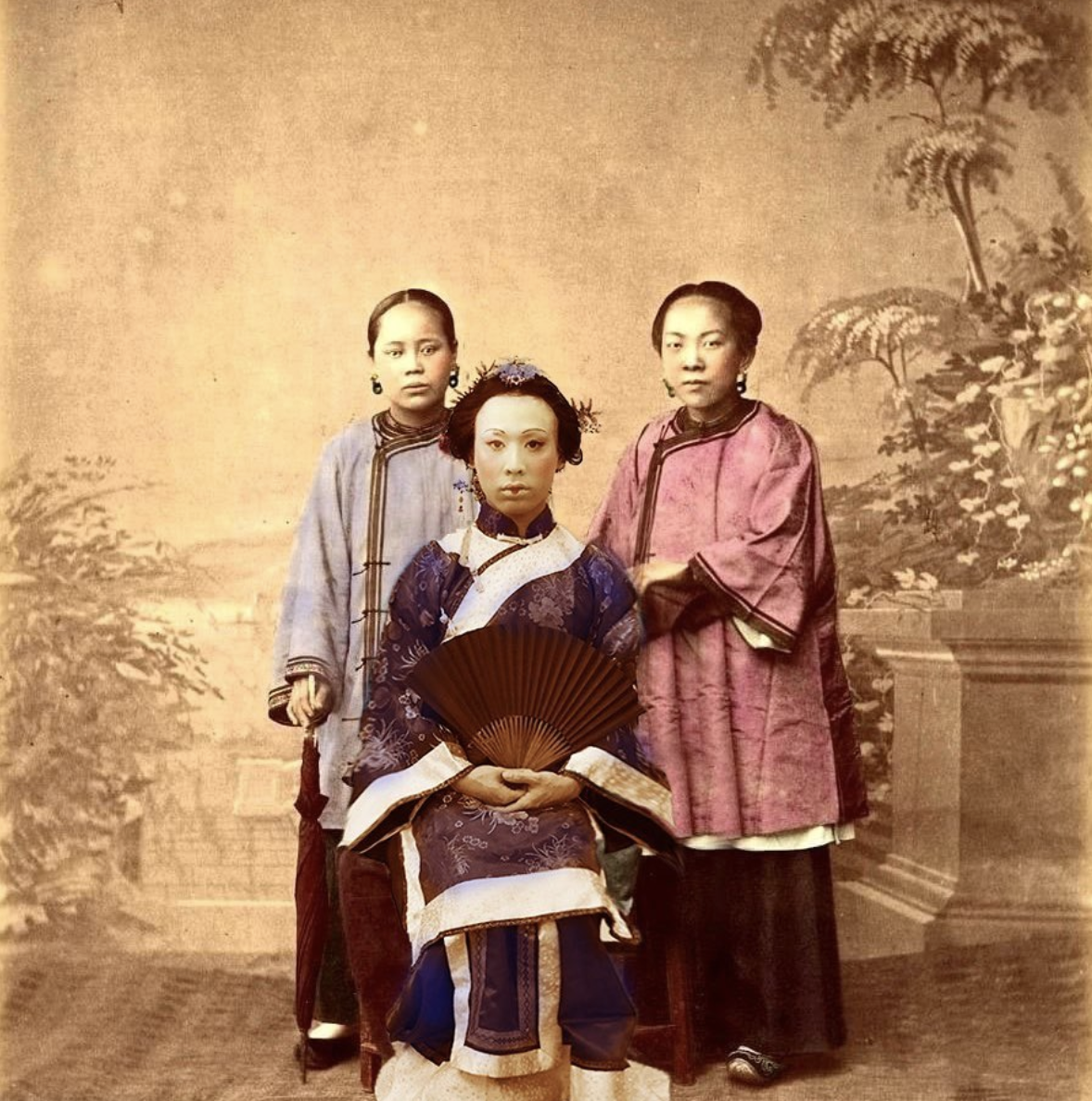
Cantonese Han noble lady with her servants in 1900s wears Manchu-influenced aoqun.

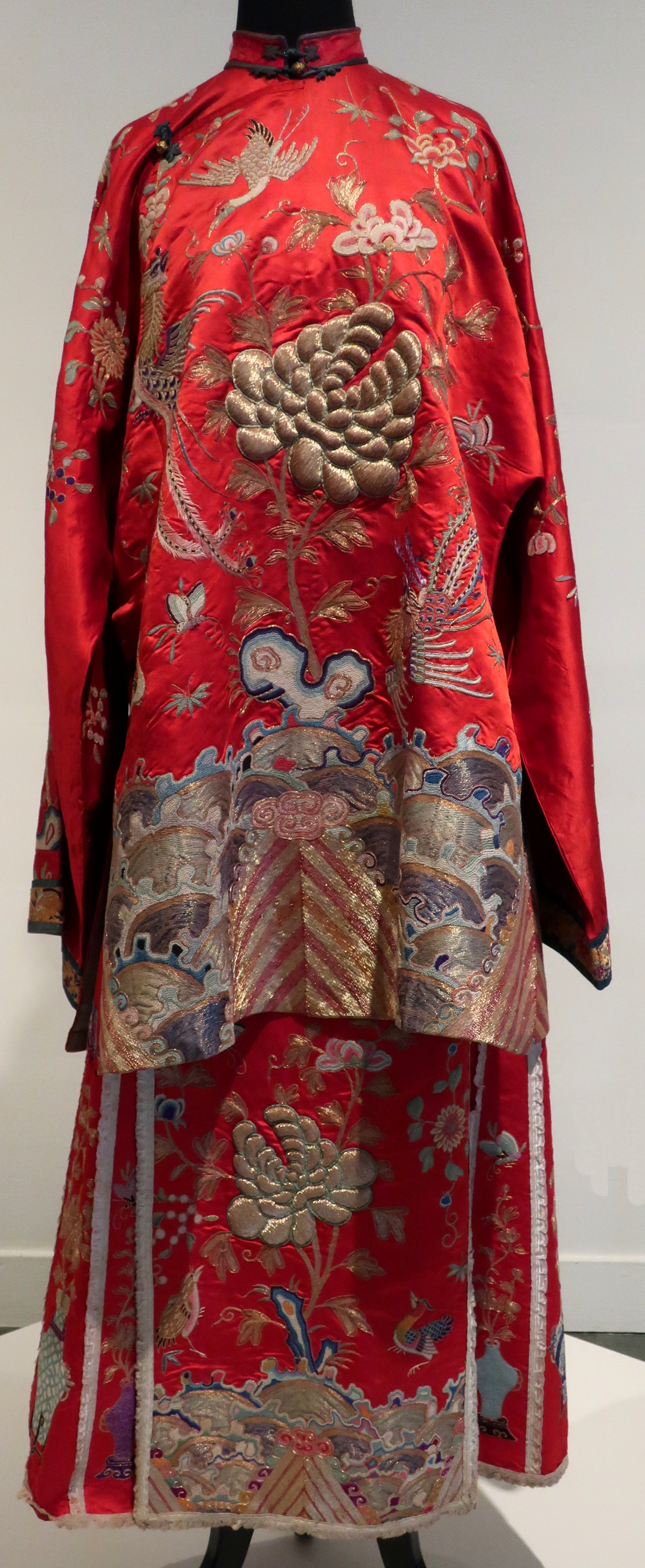
Woman's wedding costume from China, an aoqun. c. 1900.

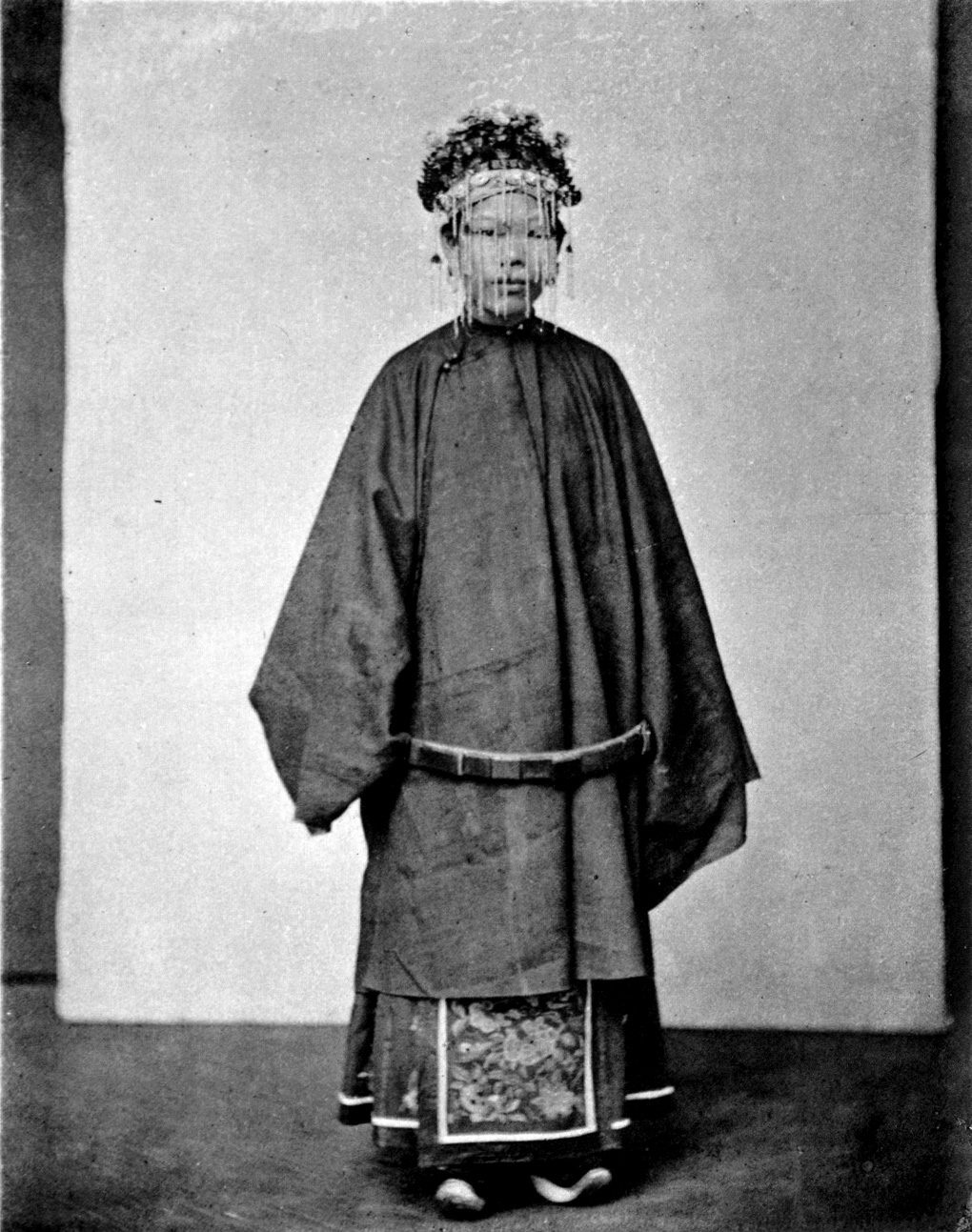
A bride wearing aoqun,

=== Modern ===
==== Republic of China ====
===== Wenming xinzhuang =====
In the early 1910s and 1920s, young women wore aoqun called Wenming xinzhuang (文明新裝), also known as the "civilized costume" or "civilized attire". It originated from the traditional yishang (衣裳) and the basic style of this clothing is clearly inherited from ancient Han Chinese clothing although the details have changed over time. The Wenming xinzhuang continued the unbroken tradition of Han Chinese women's matching a jacket with a skirt which has been established for thousand of years.

The ao of the Wenming xinzhuang was typically cyan and blue in colour while the long skirt was dark in colour, mostly in black; the ao had no complex ornaments as bindings and embroidery was rejected in this period. There was a narrow trim which would bind the hem and the side vents were rectangular in shape. The ao typically had a standing collar and long in shape with its hemline typically reaching below hip height and sometimes even at knee-height. The sleeves were short and left the wrist exposed. The skirt was derived from the baizhequn (百摺裙) and became a dark long skirt with larger pleats. With time, the skirt length eventually shortened to the point where the calves of the wearer was exposed, and the ao had a lower collar and an arc shaped vents started to appear on both sides. This style of clothing eventually faded in the early 1930s.

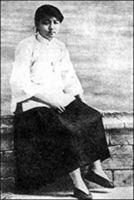
Aoqun, 1920.

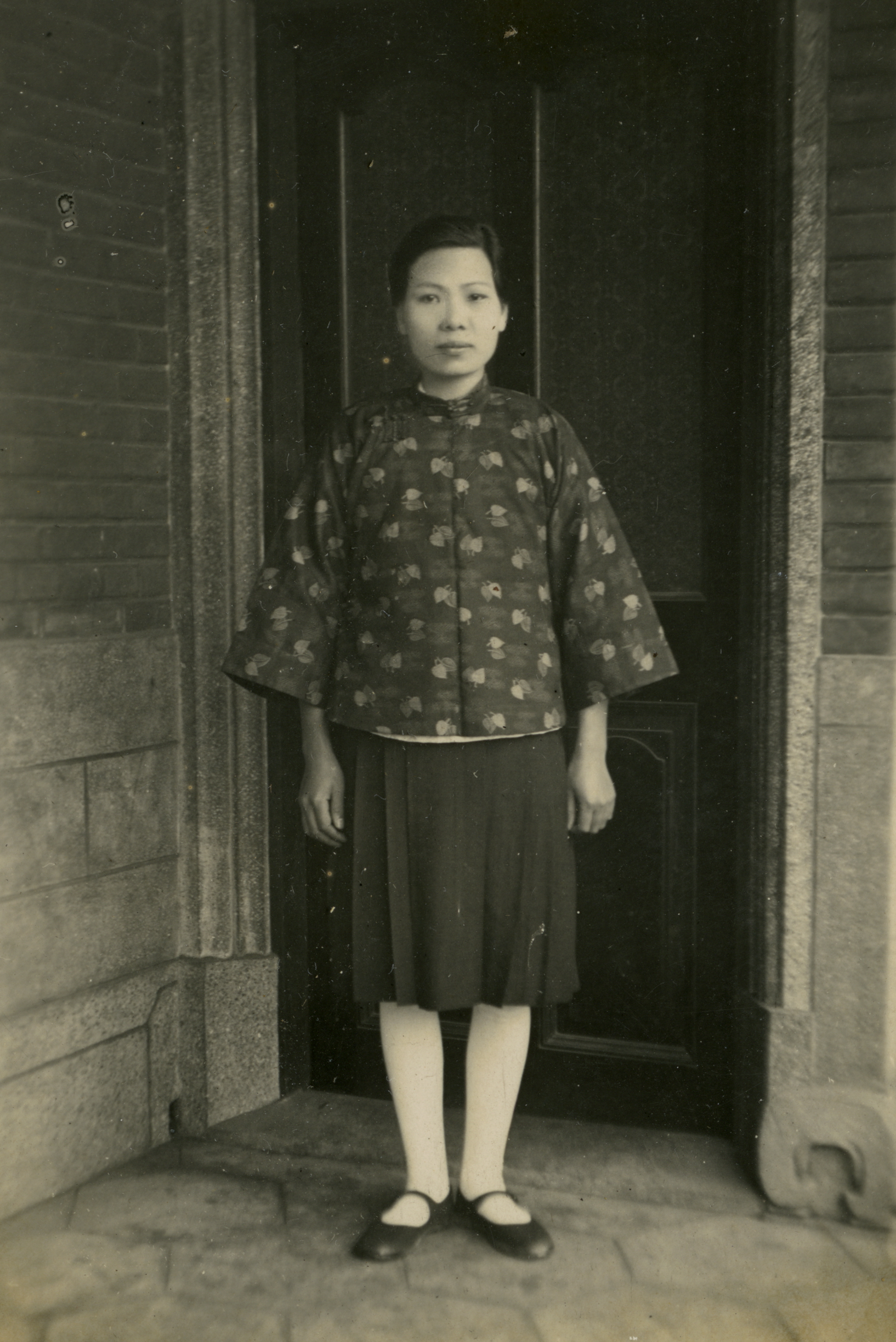
Aoqun, 1930s

==== 21st century: Modern hanfu ====
In the 21st century, several forms of ruqun, whose design are often based on the previous dynasties traditional ruqun but with modern aesthetics, gained popularity following the Hanfu movement.

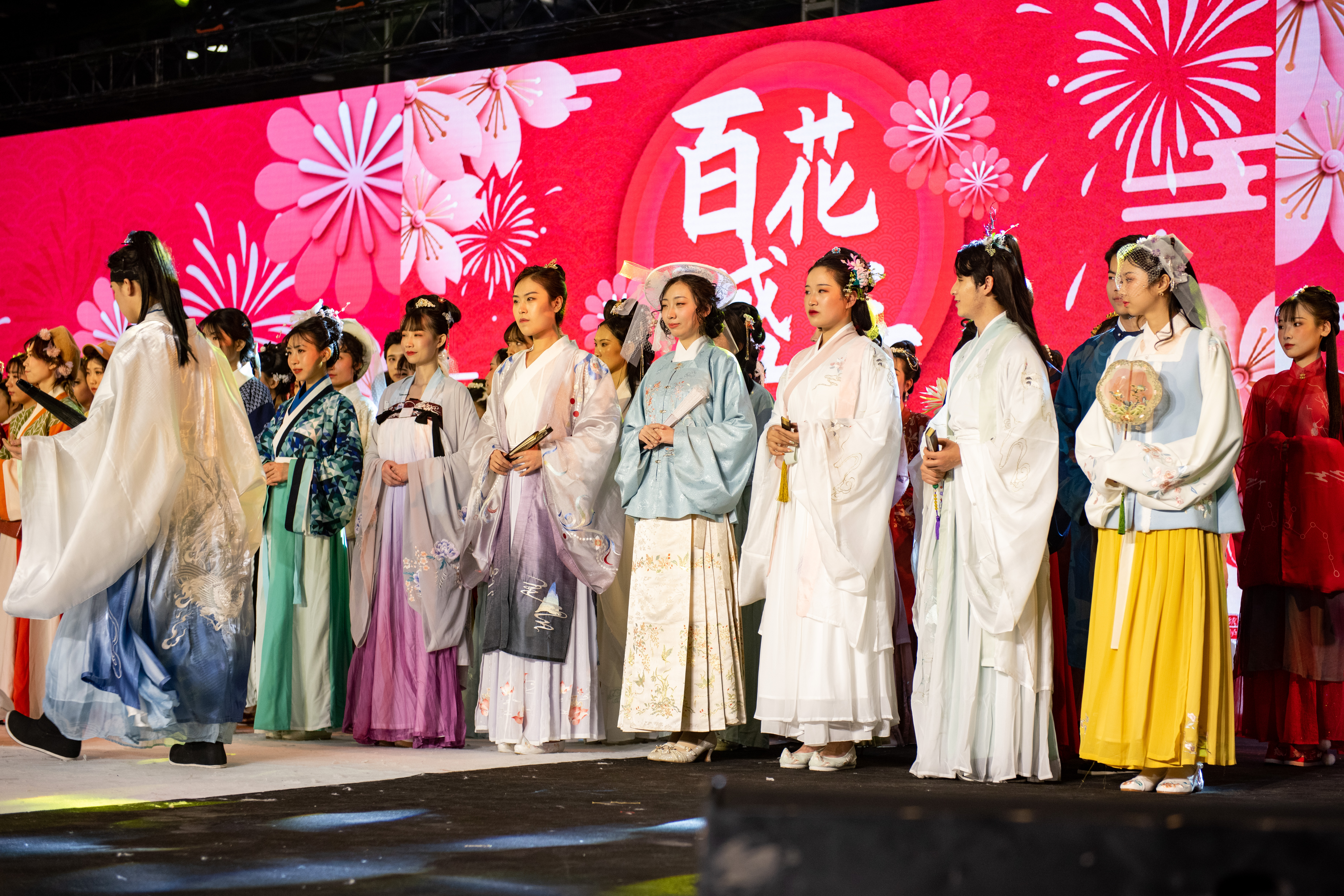
Men and women wearing different style of modern ruqun.

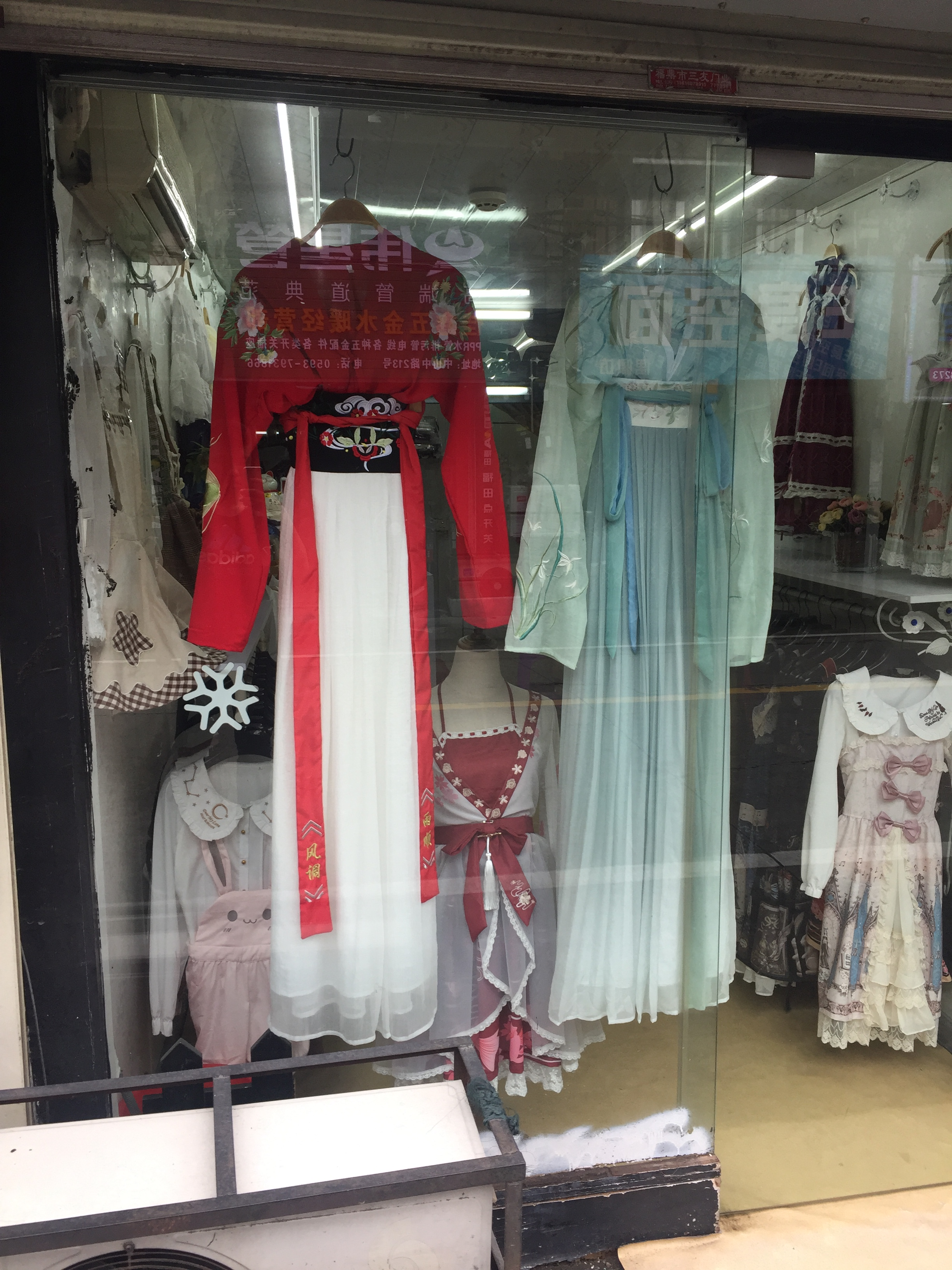
Ruqun sold in clothing store, 2018.

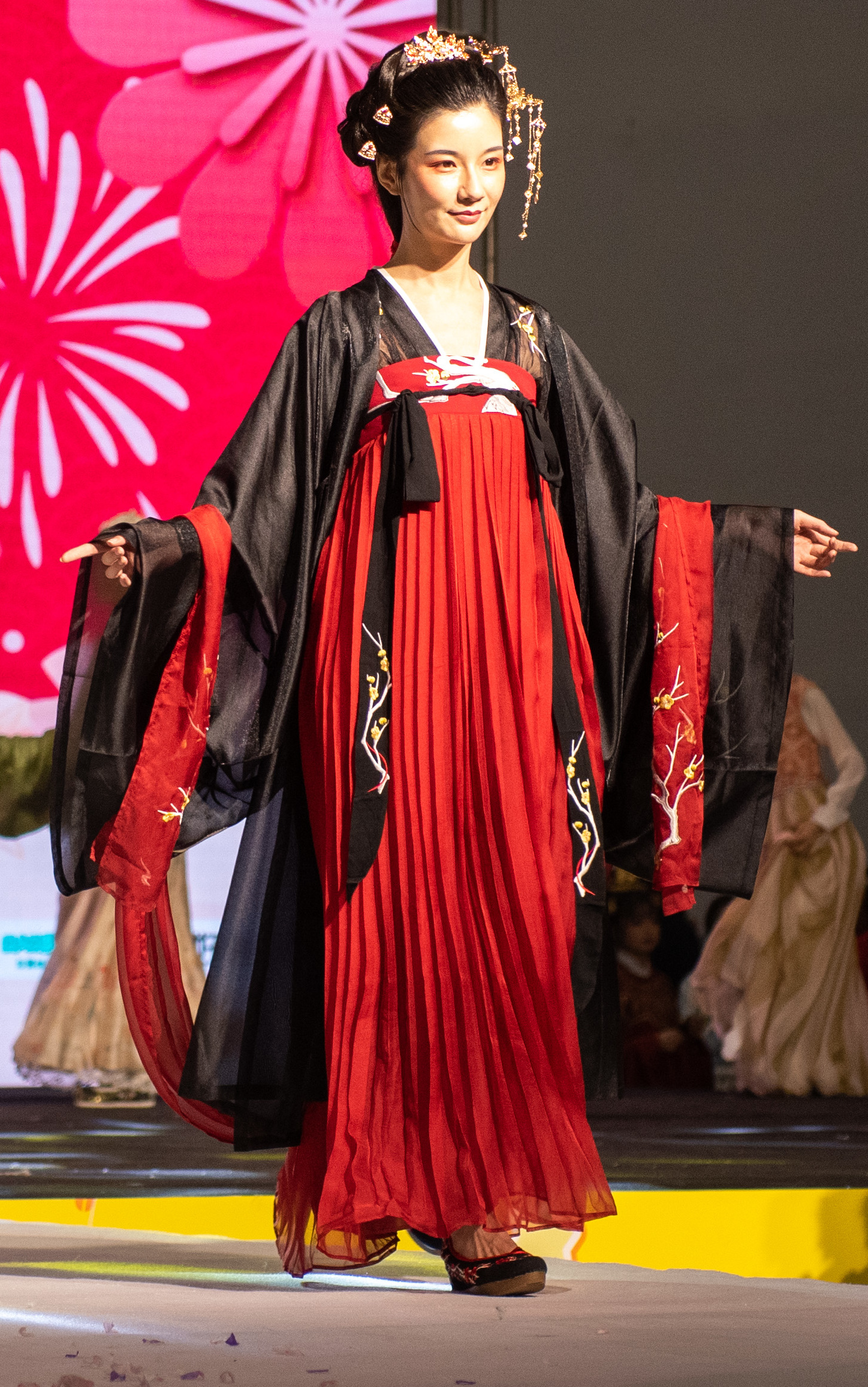
Modern qixiong ruqun.

== Construction and design ==
As a set of garments, the ruqun consists of an upper and lower garment.

The ruqun can be categorized into types based on the waist height of the skirt:

- Mid-rise (齊腰; qíyāo),
- High-rise (高腰; gāoyāo) and
- Qixiong ruqun (齐胸襦裙; qíxiōngrúqún).

The ruqun can also be categorized based on the collar style. The collar style of the upper garment can be divided into:

- crossed collar (交領; jiāolǐng),
- parallel collar (對襟; duìjīn), also known as straight collar (直领; Zhiling).

Summary of garments
Component	Romanization	Hanzi	Definition
Upper garment	Yi	衣	Open cross-collar upper garment, or refers to any form upper garment. It is unisex.
Upper garment	Ru	襦	Open cross-collar upper garment, only worn by women. It typically refers to a short jacket. It is usually waist-length, but longer forms of ru can also be found. The ru can be single-layered or multi-layered (i.e. double layered or padded).
Upper garment	Changru	长襦	A long ru jacket; the precursor of the long ao.
Upper garment	Ao	袄	Multi-layer open cross-collar shirt or jacket. It was mainly worn as winter clothing.
Upper garment	Shan	衫	Lit. translated as "shirt". Single-layer open cross-collar shirt or jacket. It can also be worn over the yi (衣).
Upper garment	Changao	長襖	A longer version of the ao
Upper garment	Gua	褂	A jacket with a central closure which closes with buttons. They appeared to be made of thinner fabric than the ao and was worn in summer. It was worn as a female wedding jacket.
Lower garment	Chang/shang	裳	Skirt for men, or may refers to any form of lower garment including skirts and trousers. In the Shang dynasty, the chang could also refer to an ankle-length skirt which was a unisex garment.
Lower garment	Qun	裙	Skirt for women.

=== Women's skirts ===
Throughout history, Han Chinese women wore many kind of skirts which came in variety of styles; some of which had their own specific names.

== Types of ruqun ==
- Qixiong ruqun
- Qungua (裙褂): a type of ruqun worn as a traditional Chinese wedding dress during Qing and the modern era.
- Tanling ruqun: a type of ruqun with a U-shaped upper garment.
- Xiuhefu (秀禾服): a modern bridal attire inspired by the aoqun and Qing wedding dress traditions.

== See also ==
- Hanfu (List of Hanfu)
- Mianfu
- Xuanduan (玄端): a very formal dark ruqun with accessories; equivalent to the Western white tie.
- Shanku
