= Fuyao =

Fuyao may refer to:

- Fuyao (fashion), designation for deviant garment items in imperial China
- Fuyao Group, Chinese glassmaking company
- Legend of Fuyao (Chinese: 扶搖; pinyin: Fúyáo), 2018 Chinese TV series
- Fuyao Islands off the coast of Fuding, China
