= Maweiqun =

Crinoline-like underskirt for men imported from Joseon

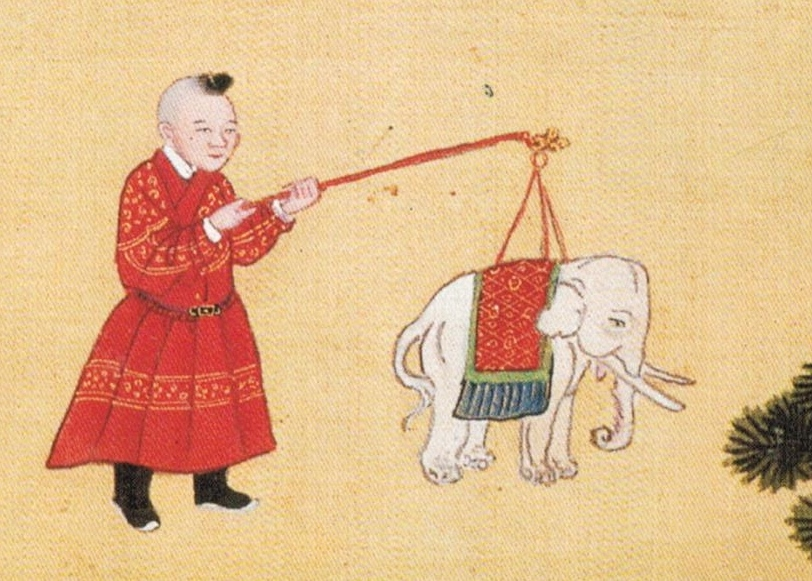
- A boy wearing a red robe called tieli from the painting 宪宗行乐图, Winter, 1485 AD, Ming dynasty. Based on the silhouette of the tieli, maweiqun (or a similar item) was possibly worn under the tieli (invisible in the painting as it is an underskirt).
- Type: A crinoline
- Material: Woven horsehair tail
- Place of origin: Joseon, possibly Jeju Island
- Manufacturer: Ming dynasty, China, and possibly Jeju Island
- Introduced: Chenghua period, Ming dynasty, China, mid-to-late 15th century

Maweiqun

Chinese name
- Traditional Chinese: 馬尾裙
- Simplified Chinese: 马尾裙
- Literal meaning: Horsetail skirt; ponytail skirt
Transcriptions
Standard Mandarin
- Hanyu Pinyin: Mǎwěiqún

Faqun
- Traditional Chinese: 髮裙
- Simplified Chinese: 发裙
- Literal meaning: Hair skirt
Transcriptions
Standard Mandarin
- Hanyu Pinyin: Fāqún

Korean name
- Hangul: 마미군
- Hanja: 馬尾裙
Transcriptions
- Revised Romanization: Mamigun

Alternative Korean name
- Hangul: 발군
- Hanja: 髮裙
Transcriptions
- Revised Romanization: Balgun

English name
- English: Horsehair skirt

Maweiqun (simplified Chinese: 马尾裙; traditional Chinese: 馬尾裙; Korean: 마미군; Hanja: 馬尾裙; RR: mamigun), also called faqun (Chinese: 发裙; Korean: 발군; Hanja: 髮裙; RR: palgun) is a form of underskirt, which was made of woven horsetail. It was tied inside the undergarments of its wearer. The function of the maweiqun was similar to a crinoline making the outer skirt appearing wider.

The wearing of maweiqun as part of undergarments was a briefly popular male fashion during the Ming dynasty, China. It was popular for a few years from the mid-to-late 15th century during the reign of Emperor Chenghua (1465 –1488), and then quickly disappeared by the reign of Hongzhi (1488 – 1506). According to the historical records dating to the Ming dynasty, the maweiqun originated in Joseon (朝鲜国) and was first imported in the capital of the Ming dynasty according to the Shuyuan zaji (椒园杂记) by Lu Rong (1436–1494). Maweiqun was later produced by Ming dynasty local weavers by the late 15th century when the local weavers gained the horsetails weaving skills leading to the theft of tails from the horses owned by officials in order to supply themselves with the necessary materials to produce the underskirt. This form of fashion was however perceived as exotic rather than Chinese. Despite its popularity, the maweiqun was considered fuyao (Chinese: 服妖) or deviant, and was eventually banned in the early reigning years of Emperor Hongzhi during the times of Lu Rong. Emperor Hongzhi's ban led to the end of the popularity of the maweiqun and its disappearance.

There is no record of the term maweiqun in the historical records found in the Joseon dynasty dating to the fifteenth century, such as the Veritable Records of the Joseon Dynasty, the "Private records of diplomatic envoys" (使行錄), or in the "Written collections" (文集) written by the scholars-officials. The popularity of the maweiqun in the Ming dynasty during this period was not recorded by the Joseon envoys in Beijing, the capital of the Ming dynasty nor was it recorded in the range of items lists which had been sent to Han Kyeran, a Joseon-born woman sent to the Ming dynasty as a female tribute who eventually became an imperial concubine of Emperor Xuande and who raised the Emperor Chenghua. There is currently no maweiqun or any skirt similar to the maweiqun in form which had been detected in the unearthed garment items excavated from the early Joseon period. There is a high possibility that the maweiqun actually did not originate from Joseon and that its Joseon origin was a rumour which left Lu Rong with inaccurate information when the latter wrote his collection. It is, however, proposed by Doyoung Koo, a research Fellow at the Northeast Asian History Foundation, that the maweiqun might be related to a Joseon garment item called chongŭi (Korean: 鬃衣; lit. 'horsehair clothing'), which can be found in the Veritable Records of the Joseon dynasty. According to a conversation between King Sojong of Joseon and Yu Chakwang in 1490, the weaving of chongŭi was also illegal and banned in Joseon as horsehair tail and mane were cut off and were taken away. Doyoung Koo also proposed that the chongŭi were produced and circulated in Jeju Island, a large horse breeding region, and were introduced in Jiangnan where it became popular instead of Beijing, thus explaining that there is no records of maweiqun in Joseon records.

== Terminology ==
Maweiqun (马尾裙) is literally translated as 'horsetail skirt'. The term is composed of the characters mawei (马尾裙) which means 'horsetail' and qun (裙) which means 'skirt'. The term maweiqun was used by Lu Rong in the Shuyuan zaji (椒园杂记).

Faqun (发裙) is literally translated as 'hair skirt'. The term is composed of two characters fa (发) which means 'hair' and qun (裙) which means 'skirt'. The term faqun was used in the Yubu biji (寓圃笔记) by a Ming dynasty scholar during the reign of Hongzhi named Wang Qi (王锜).

In the Gujin Xiaoshi (古今笑史) by Feng Menglong, it was referred as maweichenqun (马尾衬裙). The term is composed of the characters mawei (马尾) which means 'horsetail' and chenqun (衬裙) which means 'petticoat'.

In the Mingshilu Xiaozongshilu (明實錄孝宗實錄), it was referred as maweifu (马尾服), which is literally translated as 'horsetail dress'.

== Construction and design ==
According to Wang Qi, a Ming dynasty scholar, the faqun could be tied inside the undergarments in order to "expand the skirt to look like an umbrella", akin to a crinoline. According to Wang Qi, when people were fat, they would wear one faqun, but when they were thin, they would wear two or three faqun. The use of horsehair would provide structure and stiffness which would make an outerskirt spread outwards making it look like an umbrella.

== History in Chinese records ==
The skill of weaving of horse-hair was rare in China. According to the Shuyuan zaji (椒园杂记) by Lu Rong (1436–1494), maweiqun was originally imported in the capital of the Ming dynasty from Joseon where people could buy them, but at that time, no one in the capital had the ability to weave them. Upon its introduction in the capital, the maweiqun was initially only worn by rich merchants, youth of nobility, and singing courtesans; but eventually, it was later worn by even military officials. Later on, it is only when some people in the capital of the Ming dynasty started to produce it and sell it that more people to wear it regardless of social status and become widely accepted. According to Lu Rong, some court officials (朝官) were wearing it in the late years of reign of Chenghua.

According to Chen Hongmo, another Ming dynasty scholar, the popularity of the maweiqun during the Chenghua and Hongzhi period led to people pulling off the tails of some military horses. According to Feng Menglong in the Gujin Xiaoshi (古今笑史), an official gave the advice to ban the maweiqun in the early days of Hongzhi as the liking of the maweiqun among the literati in the capital led to the stealth of tails of horses. The maweiqun was banned in the early Hongzhi era (1487-1505) according to the Shuyuan zaji and to the Mingshilu Xiaozongshilu (明實錄孝宗實錄) in 1488 AD. Emperor Hongzhi's ban led to the end of the popularity of the maweiqun and its disappearance.

== Cultural significance ==
Although the faqun was worn by some court officials, it was criticized by some Confucian scholars who deemed it as fuyao (服妖). Fuyao is a general term with negative connotation which is employed for what is considered as being strange clothing style, or for deviant dressing styles, or for aberrance in clothing. Clothing considered as fuyao typically (i) violates ritual norms and clothing regulations, (ii) are extravagant and luxurious form of clothing, (iii) violates the yin and yang principle, and (iv) are strange and inauspicious form of clothing.

Wang Qi himself criticized it, "Some people wear this [faqun] to show off. But only vulgar officials and profligate sons of the newly rich wear it. Scholars look down on it very much because it is close to the bewitching dress (fuyao)". The Shuyuan zaji (椒园杂记) also refer to it as being fuyao.

In the case of the maweiqun, its widened silhouette also made it shàngjiǎn xiàfēng (上俭下丰; "top is frugal, bottom is rich") which reflects an inversion of Heaven and Earth, and therefore contradicts the traditional Chinese principle of Heaven and Earth order. In traditional Chinese culture, the symbolism of two-pieces garments hold great importance as it symbolizes the greater order of Heaven and Earth; in the I-Ching, upper garment represents Heaven while the lower garment represents the Earth.

== See also ==
- Sokgot - Korean undergarments
- Mamianqun - A traditional Han Chinese skirt
