= Hoop skirt =

Undergarment that holds the shape of a dress

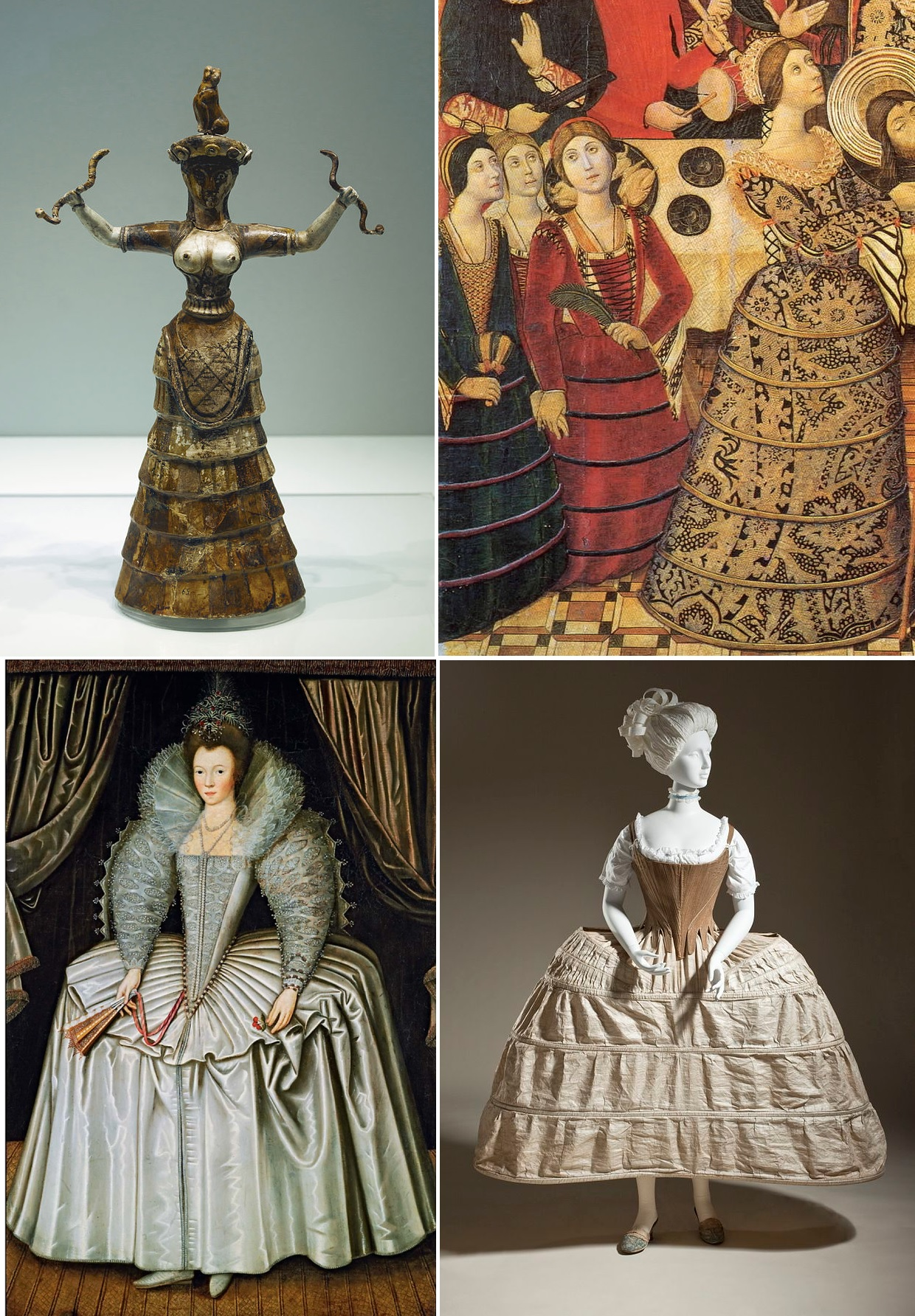
Top: Minoan statuette, 1600 BCE. Verdugada, c. 1470s Bottom: Farthingale, c. 1600. Hoop or pannier, 1750–80.

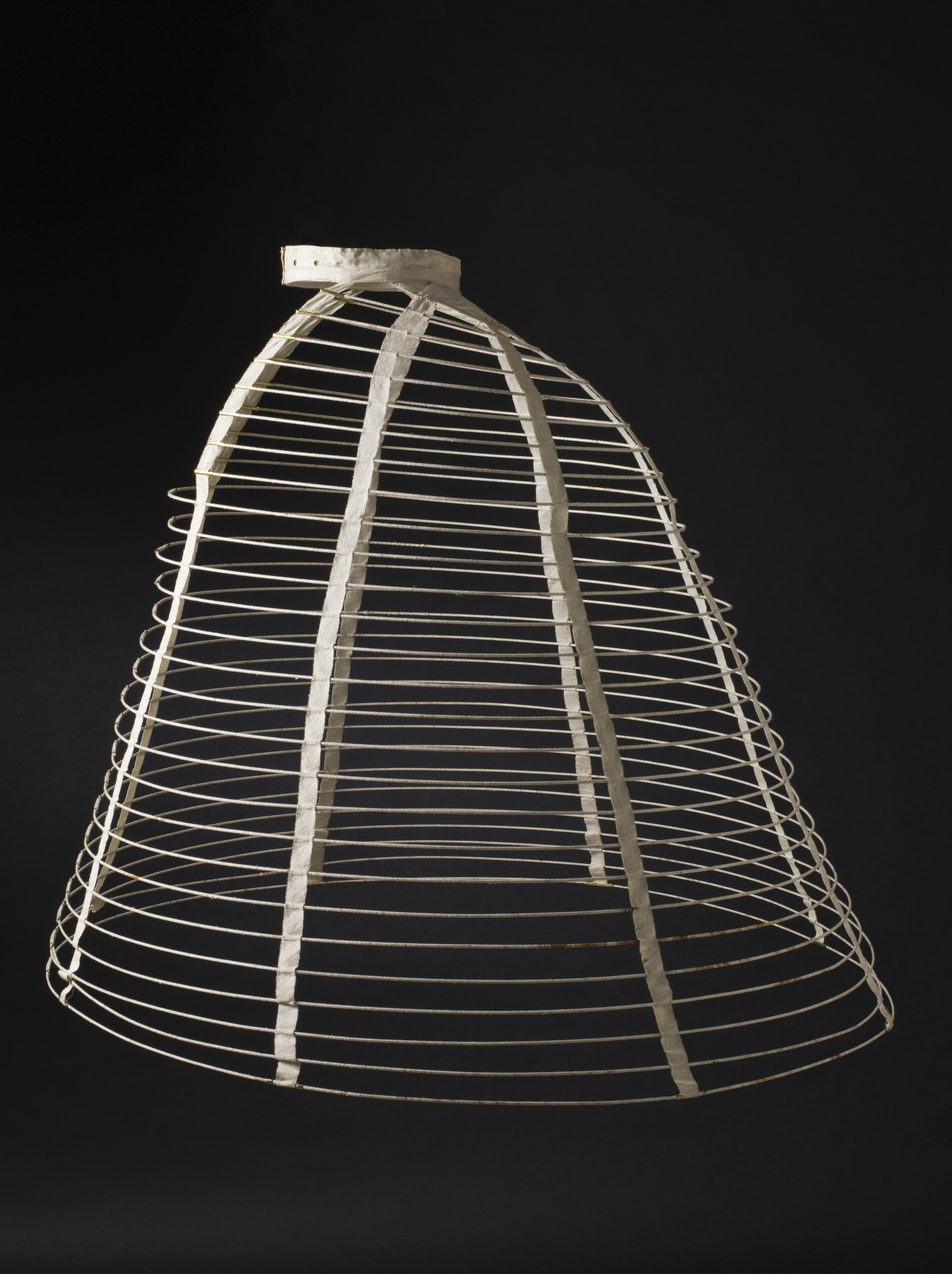
Cage crinoline with steel hoops, 1865

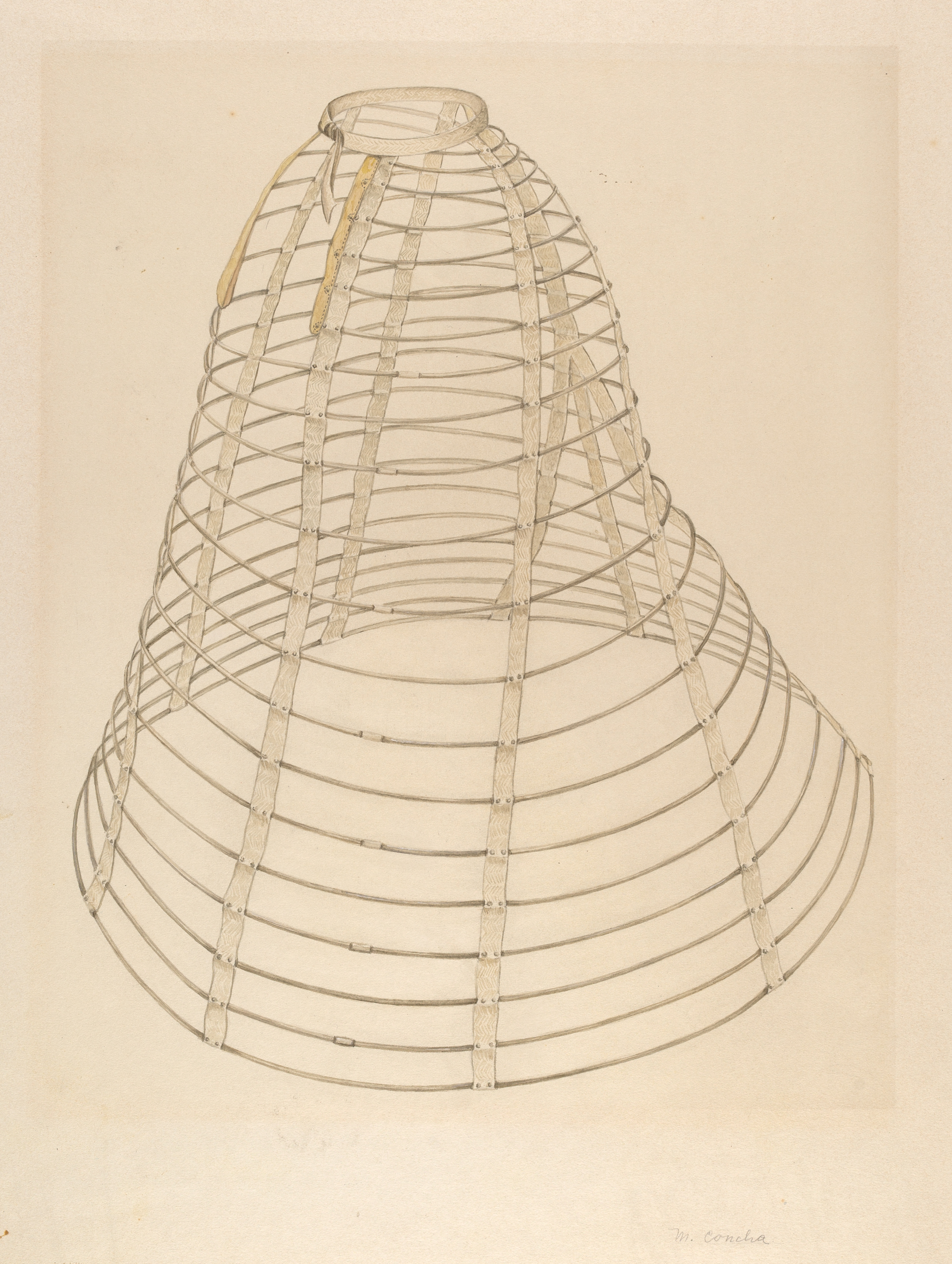
Margaret Concha, hoop skirt, c. 1937

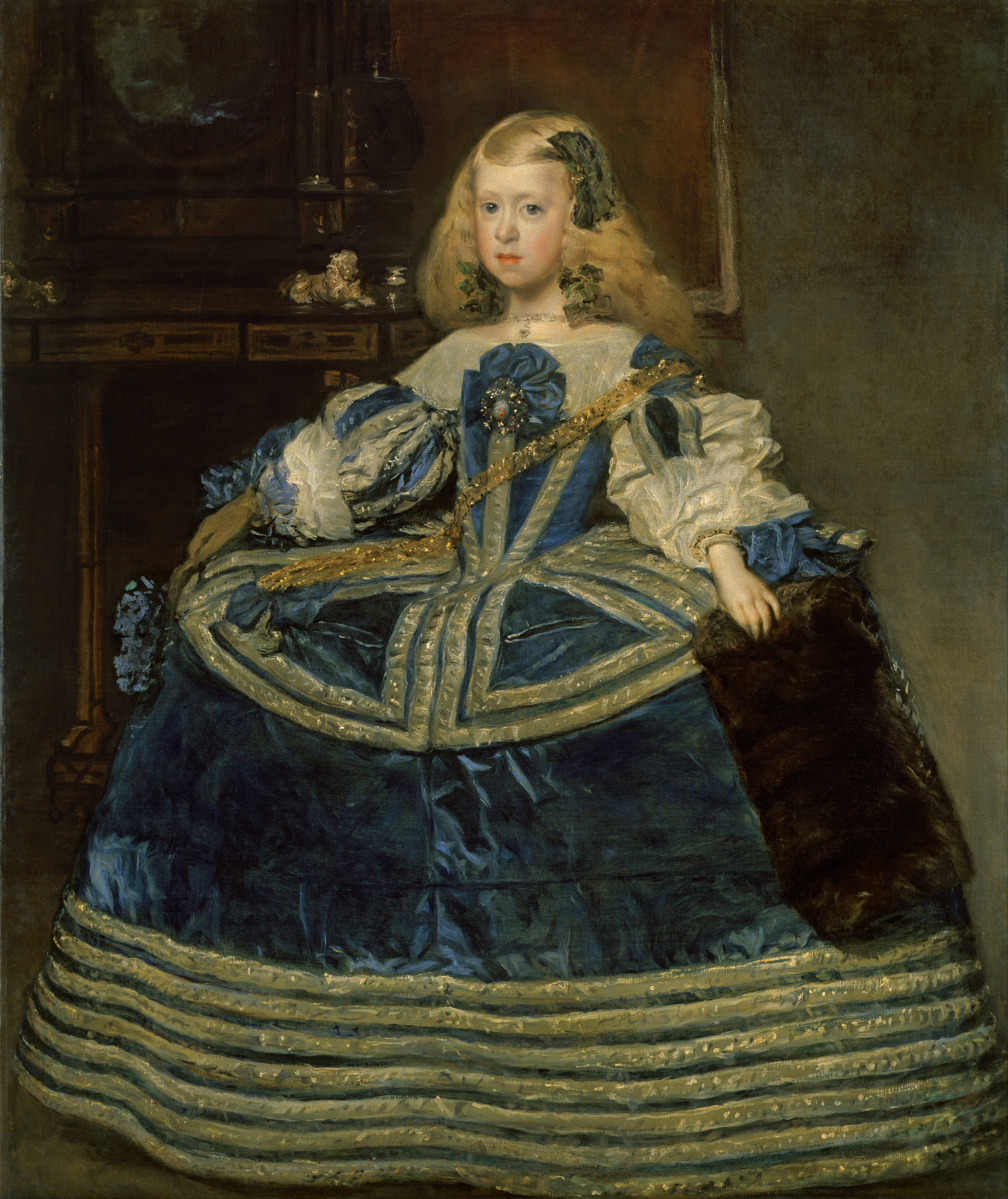
Infanta Margarita Teresa wearing a farthingale

A hoop skirt is a type of structured undergarment, worn underneath a skirt or dress to create a wider and fuller shape, popular during the late 19th-century. The garments allowed women to create the shape and volume that was fashionable at the time. Hoop skirts created a distinctive feature of fashion during the Victorian era and continue to influence shape and structures of dresses today.

== Earlier forms ==
=== Flounced Skirts ===
During the Bronze Age, unisex garments such as the kaunakes of Mesopotamia could serve as a proto-hoop skirt, made from tufted wool wrapped around the waist. Tiered skirts could also be found in the Minoan and Mycenaean periods of Ancient Greece, worn by the women of Crete.

=== Mamigun ===
In the 15th century onwards, women of Joseon Korea would wear a horse-hair skirt known as the mamigun (馬尾裙), a kind of sokchima which would give structure to the bell-shaped skirts associated with Hanbok. It would go on to influence the unisex Maweiqun of Ming dynasty China, during the rule of the Chenghua Emperor.

=== Farthingale ===
In the 16th and 17th centuries, farthingales were structured hoops worn under skirts to create a wider, more exaggerated silhouette. These early skirt supports established the use of structured garments to give their clothes shape and volume.

=== Panniers ===
In the 18th century panniers, or side hoops, primarily expanded skirts at the sides creating a wide silhouette. These earlier forms of skirt support helped establish the use of structured garments to shape fashionable clothing.

=== Crinoline ===
By the 19th century stiffened petticoats were commonly used to create volume, but they could be heavy and cumbersome. This eventually contributed to the development of the cage crinoline.

== Introduction of the hoop skirt (1846) ==
Hoop skirts were first introduced to the United States by David Hough, Jr. in 1846. These were also the first shaping undergarment to be worn by every woman of every social class.

The hoop skirt originated as a mechanism for holding long skirts away from ones legs, to stay cooler in hot climates, and to keep from tripping on the skirt during various activities.

Small hoops might be worn by farmers and while working in the garden. Hoops were then adopted as a fashion item, and the size and scale of the hoops grew in grandeur, especially during the mid-nineteenth century transition from the 1850s to the 1860s.

The mania for large bell-shaped skirts phased out through the mid-1860s and slowly shifted to emphasize volume in the posterior.The crinolette came into fashion, which was basically a narrow crinoline with a flat front and cage hoops in the back. By the 1870s, the cage of the crinolette became a cage only at the rear of the woman's undergarments. This is known today as a bustle.

== Construction and Materials ==
Hoop skirts typically consist of a fabric petticoat sewn with channels designed to act as casings for stiffening materials, such as rope, osiers, whalebone, steel, or, from the mid-20th century, nylon. The crinoline of the mid-19th century was constructed from collapsible steel hoops. This allowed for easy storage and increased agility for the wearer.

== Social and Cultural Impacts ==
As the society of consumerism evolved, the roles of men and women changed and so did their dress. In the mid-19th century, the fashionable silhouette for women was a small waist with large, dome-shaped skirts. More and more petticoats were added to make the skirts appear even larger. When the circular crinoline came out in 1856, it was a revelation not only of technology but of convenience for women. The crinoline supported the weight of the numerous skirts and allowed the woman to wear fewer petticoats while still achieving the desired silhouette. The invention of the sewing machine allowed crinolines to be mass-produced at a lower cost, thus making the crinoline available for all classes.

== Periodic Names ==
Hoop skirts are called by various names in different periods:

- Maweiqun (Korean mamigun [마미군]) (15th century)
- Farthingale (Spanish verdugado) (16th century)
- Panniers or "side hoops" (18th century)
- Crinoline or crinolette (mid-19th century)

== Modern versions ==
Lightweight hoop skirts, usually with nylon hoops, are worn today under very full-skirted wedding gowns. They are also frequently used in quinceañera celebrations. Hoop skirts can sometimes be seen in the gothic fashion scene. Reproduction hoop skirts are an essential part of living history costuming, especially for American Civil War reenactment.

== Sources ==
- Arnold, Janet: Patterns of Fashion: the cut and construction of clothes for men and women 1560-1620, Macmillan 1985. Revised edition 1986. ISBN 0-89676-083-9
- Arnold, Janet: Patterns of Fashion 1 (cut and construction of women's clothing, 1660–1860), Wace 1964, Macmillan 1972. Revised metric edition, Drama Books 1977. ISBN 0-89676-026-X.
- Arnold, Janet: Patterns of Fashion 2: Englishwomen's Dresses and Their Construction c. 1860-1940, Wace 1966, Macmillan 1972. Revised metric edition, Drama Books 1977. ISBN 0-89676-027-8
- Arnold, Janet: Queen Elizabeth's Wardrobe Unlock'd, W S Maney and Son Ltd, Leeds 1988. ISBN 0-901286-20-6
- Fogg, Marnie: Fashion: The Whole Story, 2013, Prestel, New York, New York, ISBN 978-3-7913-4761-5.
