= Robe de style =

Style of dress popular in the 1920s

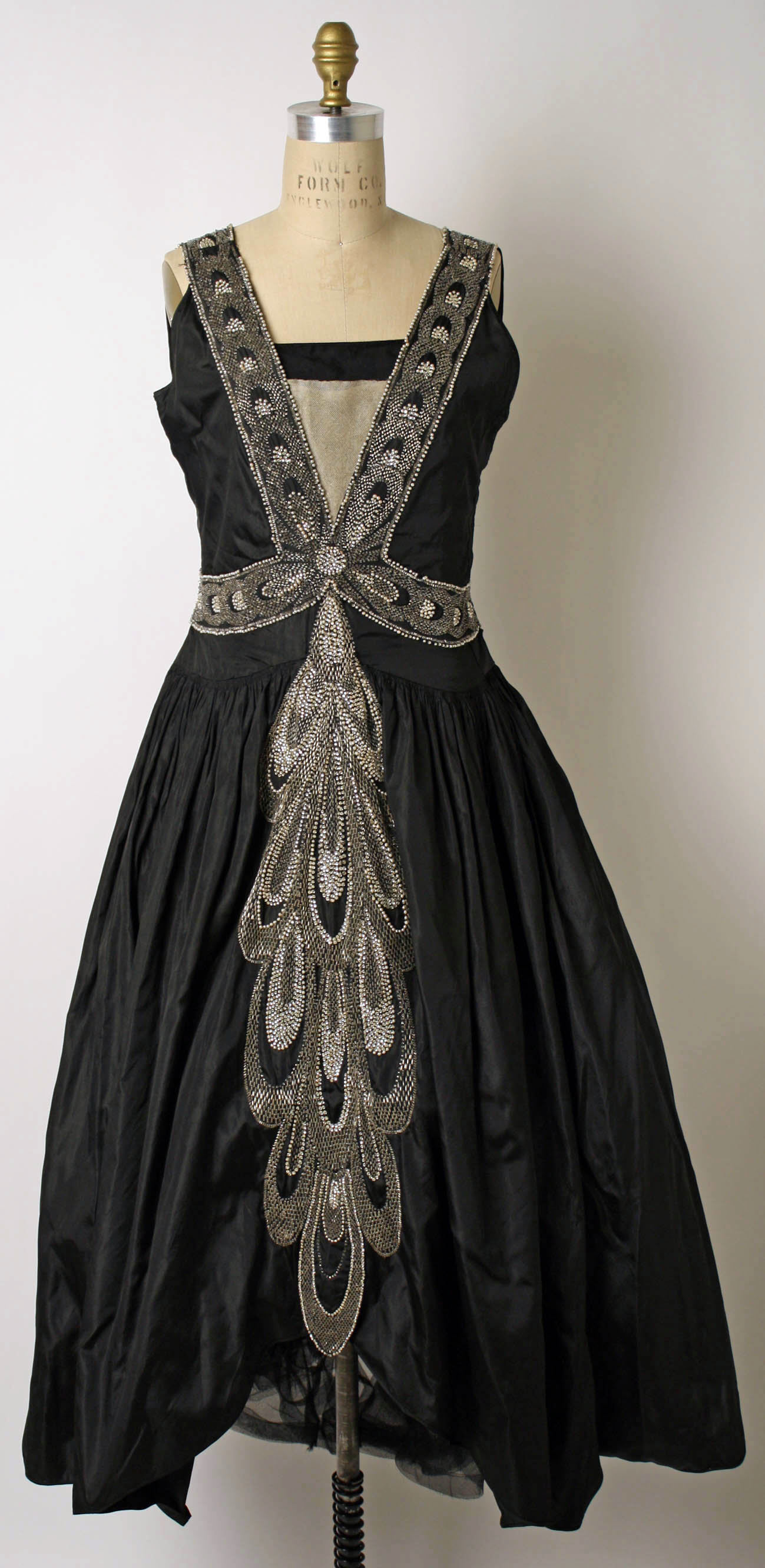
A robe de style dress by couturier Jeanne Lanvin, c. 1926–27

The robe de style describes a style of dress popular in the 1920s as an alternative to the straight-cut chemise dress.

The style was characterised by its full skirts. The bodice could be fitted, or straight-cut in the chemise manner, with a dropped waist, but it was the full skirt that denoted the robe de style. Sometimes the fullness was supported with petticoats, panniers, or hoops.

The robe de style was a signature design of the couturier Jeanne Lanvin. Other couture houses known for their versions of the robe de style included Boué Soeurs, Callot Soeurs, Doeuillet and Lucile.
