= Boué Soeurs =

French fashion house

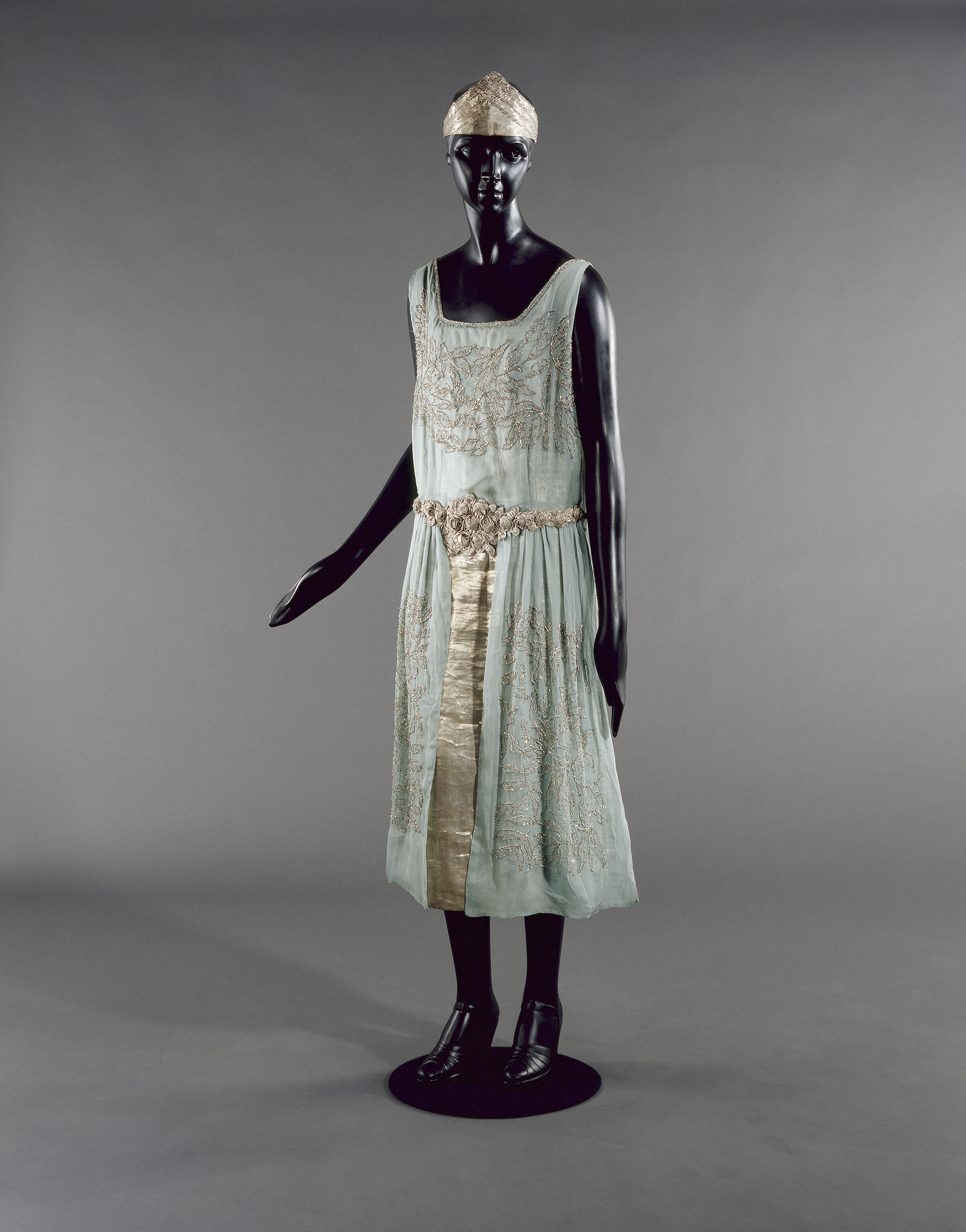
- Dress, Musée de la Mode de la Ville de Paris
- Industry: Apparel
- Founded: 1899 in Paris, France
- Founders: Sylvie Montegut; Jeanne d'Etreillis
- Defunct: 1957
- Headquarters: 9 Rue de la Paix, Paris, France
- Area served: Paris, New York

Boué Soeurs was a French fashion house active from 1899 to 1957. It was founded by sisters Madame Sylvie Montegut and Baronne Jeanne d'Etreillis under their maiden name, Boué.

== History ==
Sylvie and Jeanne Boué took an interest in design at a very early age. In a 1922 article in Arts & Decoration magazine, Jeanne wrote:

From our earliest childhood Madame Montegut and myself have craved the beautiful: our desire first took shape in the collecting of dainty ribbons, soft silks, all luxurious materials, flowers, laces – everything that expressed beauty in form and color. We began by dressing our dolls in the prevailing mode and later found an outlet for our love of the beautiful in creating our own attire.

In 1899 they opened their first shop on the Rue de la Paix in Paris where they sold women's apparel such as evening dresses, gowns, wedding dresses, frocks, lingerie, and camisoles. Baronne d'Etreillis opened a second shop in New York City in 1915.

== Style ==
Boué Soeurs was known for creating elaborate ensembles with very feminine designs. Signature elements included fine Alençon and Duchesse lace, embroidery, ribbon work, and gold and silver textiles. While some of their evening dresses retailed for $145–150 in the 1920s, designs with more exotic materials could cost as much as $2,000. Among the house's more elegant offerings was the robe de style, a design popularized by Jeanne Lanvin, which they continued to produce into the 1940s.
