= Crinoline =

Petticoat designed to hold out a skirt

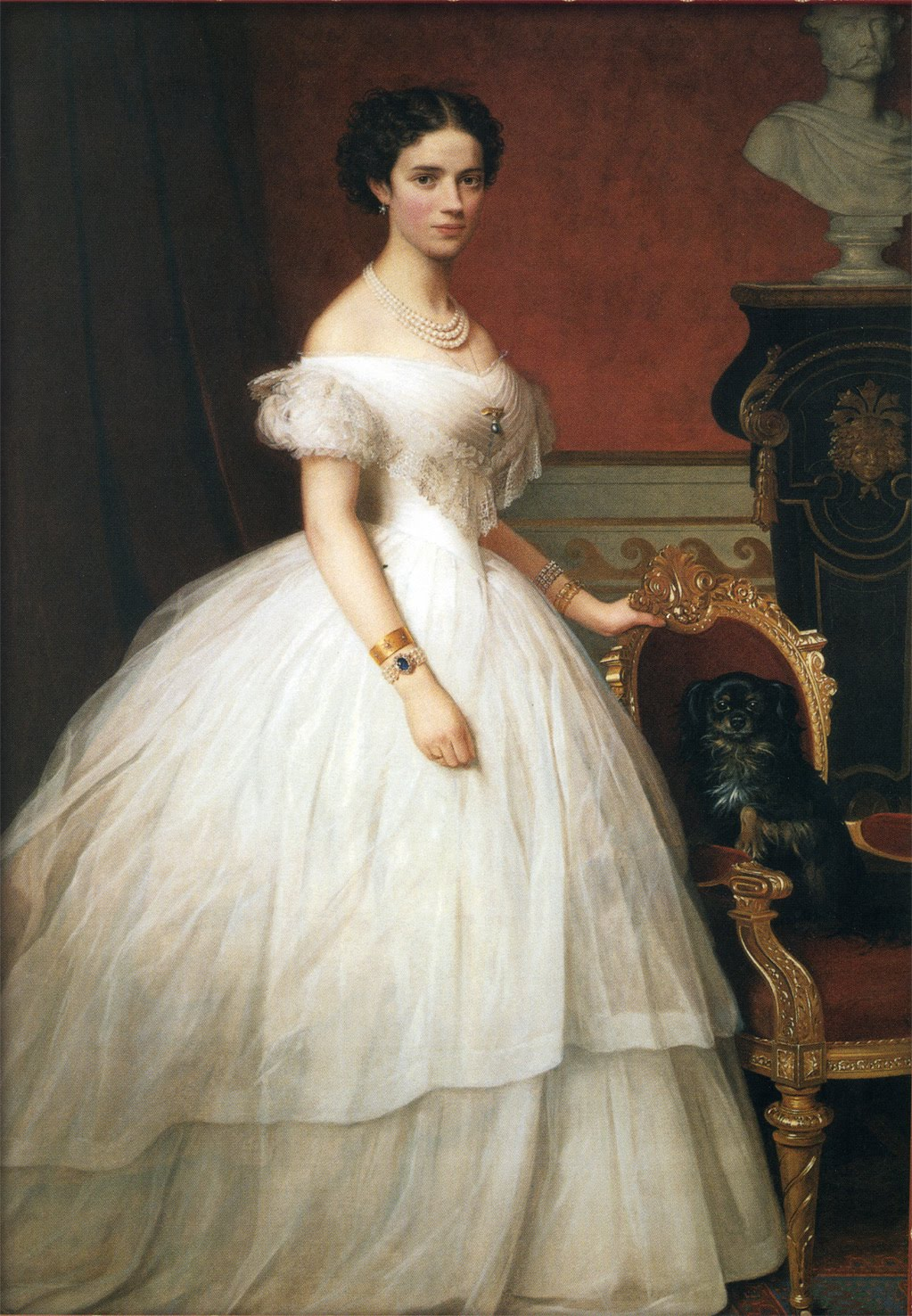
Princess Dagmar of Denmark wearing a crinoline in the 1860s

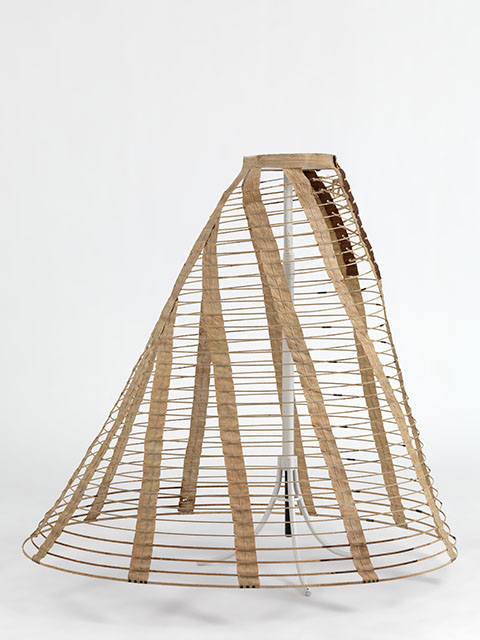
Cage crinoline underskirt, 1860s, ModeMuseum, Antwerp

A crinoline (/ˈkrɪnəlɪn/ KRIN-əl-in) is a stiff or structured petticoat designed to hold out a skirt, popular at various times since the mid-19th century. Originally, crinoline described a stiff fabric made of horsehair ("crin") and cotton or linen which was used to make underskirts and as a dress lining. The term crin or crinoline continues to be applied to a nylon stiffening tape used for interfacing and lining hemlines in the 21st century.

By the 1850s the term crinoline was more usually applied to the fashionable silhouette provided by horsehair petticoats, and to the hoop skirts that replaced them in the mid-1850s. In form and function these hoop skirts were similar to the 16th- and 17th-century farthingale and to 18th-century panniers, in that they too enabled skirts to spread even wider and more fully.

The steel-hooped cage crinoline, first patented in April 1856 by R.C. Milliet in Paris, and by their agent in Britain a few months later, became extremely popular. Steel cage crinolines were mass-produced in huge quantity, with factories across the Western world producing tens of thousands in a year. Alternative materials, such as whalebone, cane, gutta-percha, and even inflatable caoutchouc (natural rubber) were all used for hoops, although steel was the most popular. At its widest point, the crinoline could reach a circumference of up to six yards, although by the late 1860s, crinolines were beginning to reduce in size. By the early 1870s, the smaller crinolette and the bustle had largely replaced the crinoline.

The crinoline silhouette was revived several times in the 20th century, particularly in the late 1940s as a result of Christian Dior's "New Look" of 1947. The flounced nylon and net petticoats worn in the 1950s, 1960s, and early 1970s to poof out skirts also became known as crinolines even when there were no hoops in their construction. In the mid-1980s Vivienne Westwood designed the mini-crini, a mini-length crinoline which was highly influential on 1980s fashion. Late 20th and early 21st century designers such as John Galliano and Alexander McQueen have become famous for their updated crinoline designs. Since the 1980s and well into the 21st century the crinoline has remained a popular option for formal evening dresses, wedding dresses, and ball gowns.

== Etymology ==
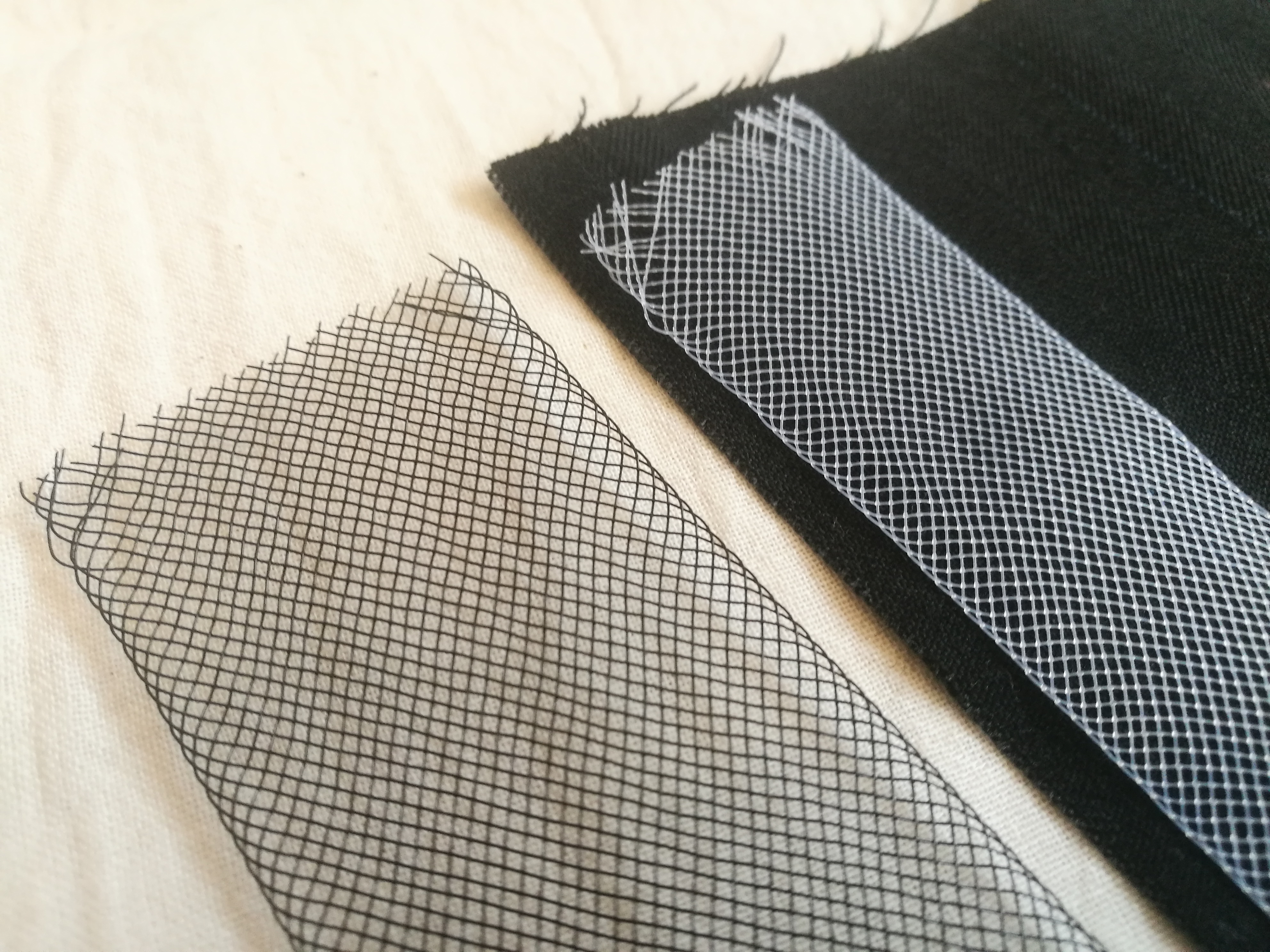
Crin tape

The name crinoline is often described as a combination of the Latin word crinis ("hair") and/or the French word crin ("horsehair"); with the Latin word linum ("thread" or "flax," which was used to make linen), describing the materials used in the original textile.

In the 21st century, the term crin is still used to describe a type of woven nylon flat braid, available in various widths and used for stiffening and providing bulk-free body to hemlines, serving the same purpose as the original crin/crinoline. Crin tape/trim is typically transparent, though it also comes in black, white, and cream colors. It is also described as horsehair braid or crinoline tape.

== Pre-1850 ==
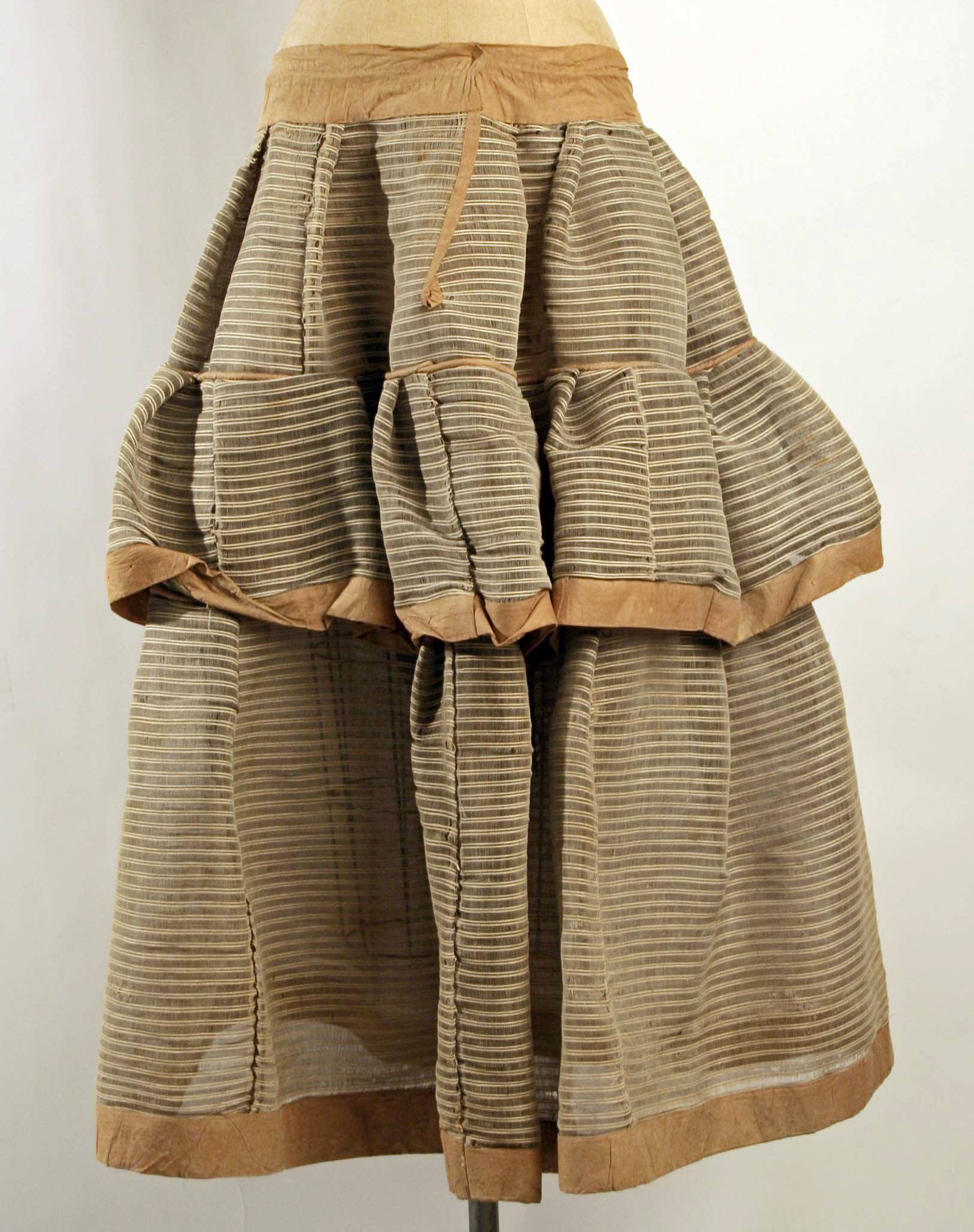
Horsehair crinoline, 1840s (MET)

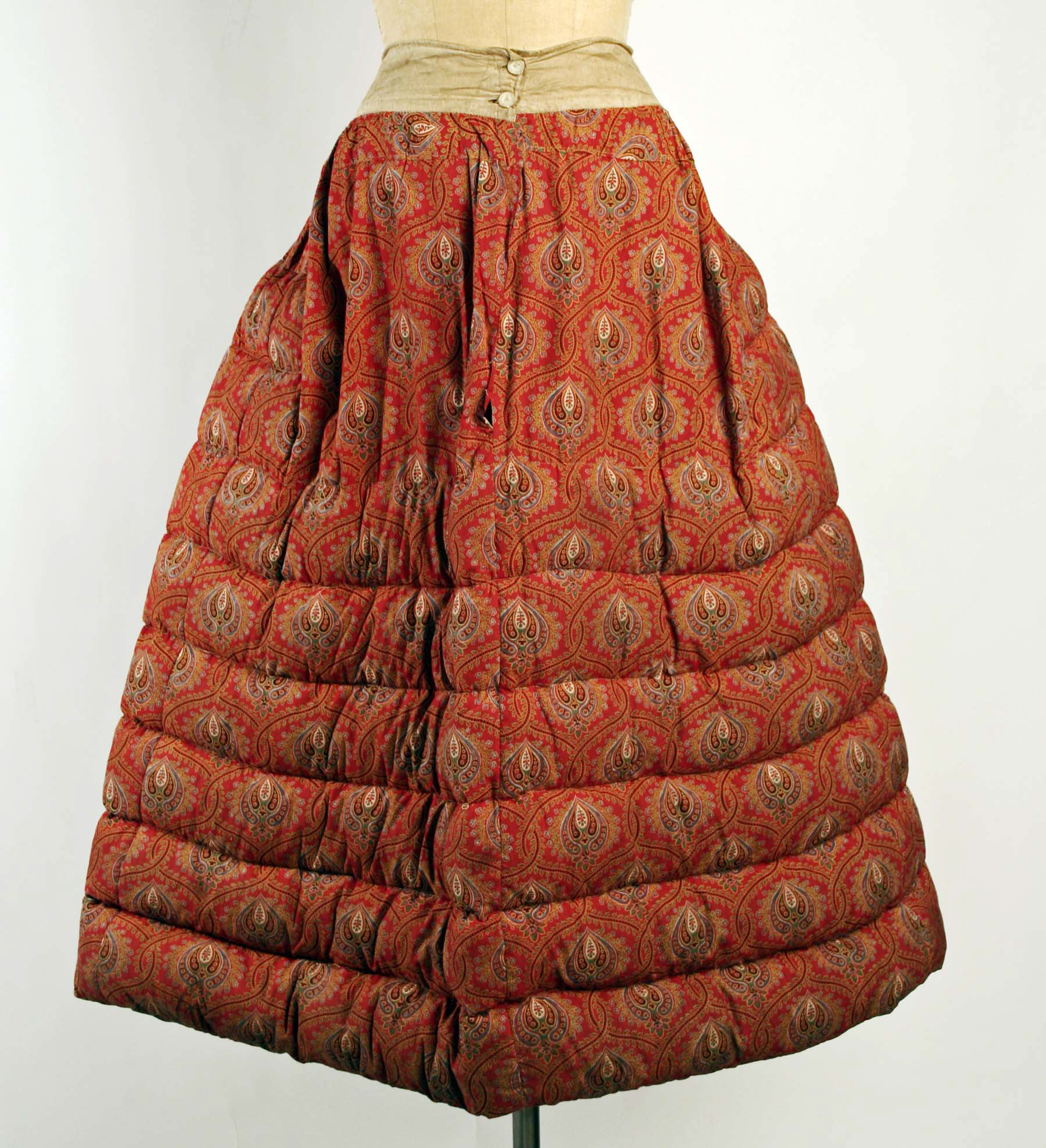
Down-quilted petticoat, British, 1860s (MET)

The crinoline was not the first garment designed to support the wearer's skirts in a fashionable shape. Whilst the bell-shaped skirts seen on statuettes from the ancient Minoan civilization are often compared to crinolines, particularly under the assumption that hoops were required to retain their shape, there is no evidence to confirm this and the theory is usually dismissed.

The crinoline's ancestors are more typically recognised as the Spanish verdugada, later known as the farthingale, widely worn in Europe from the late 15th century to the early 17th century, and the side-hoops and panniers worn throughout the 18th century.

The horsehair fabric called crinoline was first noted by 1829, when it was offered for lining and dress-making. That year, Rudolph Ackermann's Repository of Fashions described the new textile as a "fine clear stuff, not unlike in appearance to leno, but of a very strong and durable description: it is made in different colours; grey, and the colour of unbleached cambric are most in favour."

Petticoats made of horsehair crinoline appeared around 1839, proving so successful that the name 'crinoline' began to refer to supportive petticoats in general, rather than solely to the material. By 1847, crinoline fabric was being used as a stiffening for skirt linings, although English women preferred separate crinoline fabric petticoats which were beginning to collapse under the increasing weight of the skirts. One alternative to horsehair crinoline was the quilted petticoat stuffed with down or feathers, such as that reportedly worn in 1842 by Lady Aylesbury. However, quilted skirts were not widely produced until the early 1850s. In about 1849, it was possible to buy stiffened and corded cotton fabric for making petticoats, marketed as 'crinoline', and designed as a substitute for the horsehair textile. The artificial crinoline with hoops did not emerge until the 1850s.

== Late 19th century ==
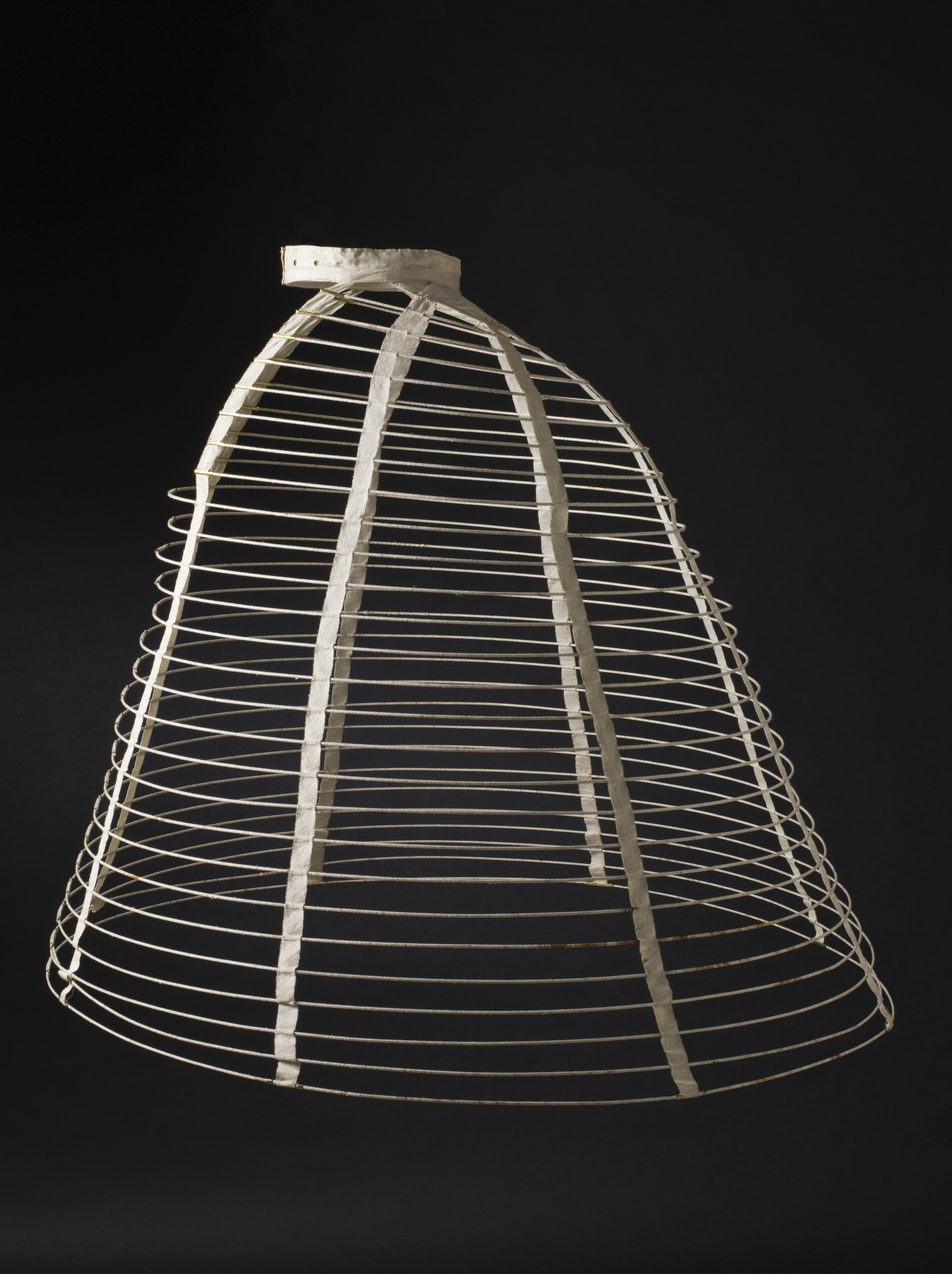
Cage crinoline with steel hoops, 1865 (LACMA)

=== 1850s–60s ===
The cage crinoline made out of spring steel wire was first introduced in the 1850s, with the earliest British patent for a metal crinoline (described as a "skeleton petticoat of steel springs fastened to tape") granted in July 1856. Alison Gernsheim suggests that the unidentified French inventor was probably Angélique Caroline Milliet of Besançon, as the July 1856 patent was filed by her British agent, C. Amet. Milliet had already patented a 'tournure de femme' in Paris on 24 April 1856 which was described as comprising "elastic extensible circles joined together by vertical bands." Following its introduction, the women's rights advocate Amelia Bloomer felt that her concerns about the hampering nature of multiple petticoats had been resolved, and dropped dress reform as an issue. Diana de Marly, in her biography of the couturier Charles Frederick Worth, noted that by 1858 there existed steel factories catering solely to crinoline manufacturers, and shops that sold nothing else but crinolines. One of the most significant manufacturers of crinolines was that of Thomson & Co., founded by an American with branches across Europe and the United States. At the height of their success, up to four thousand crinolines were produced by Thomson's London factory in a day, whilst another plant in Saxony manufactured 9.5 million crinolines over a twelve-year period. In 1859, the New York factory, which employed about a thousand girls, used 300,000 yards (270,000 m) of steel wire every week to produce between three and four thousand crinolines per day, while the rival Douglas & Sherwood factory in Manhattan used one ton of steel each week in manufacturing hoop skirts.

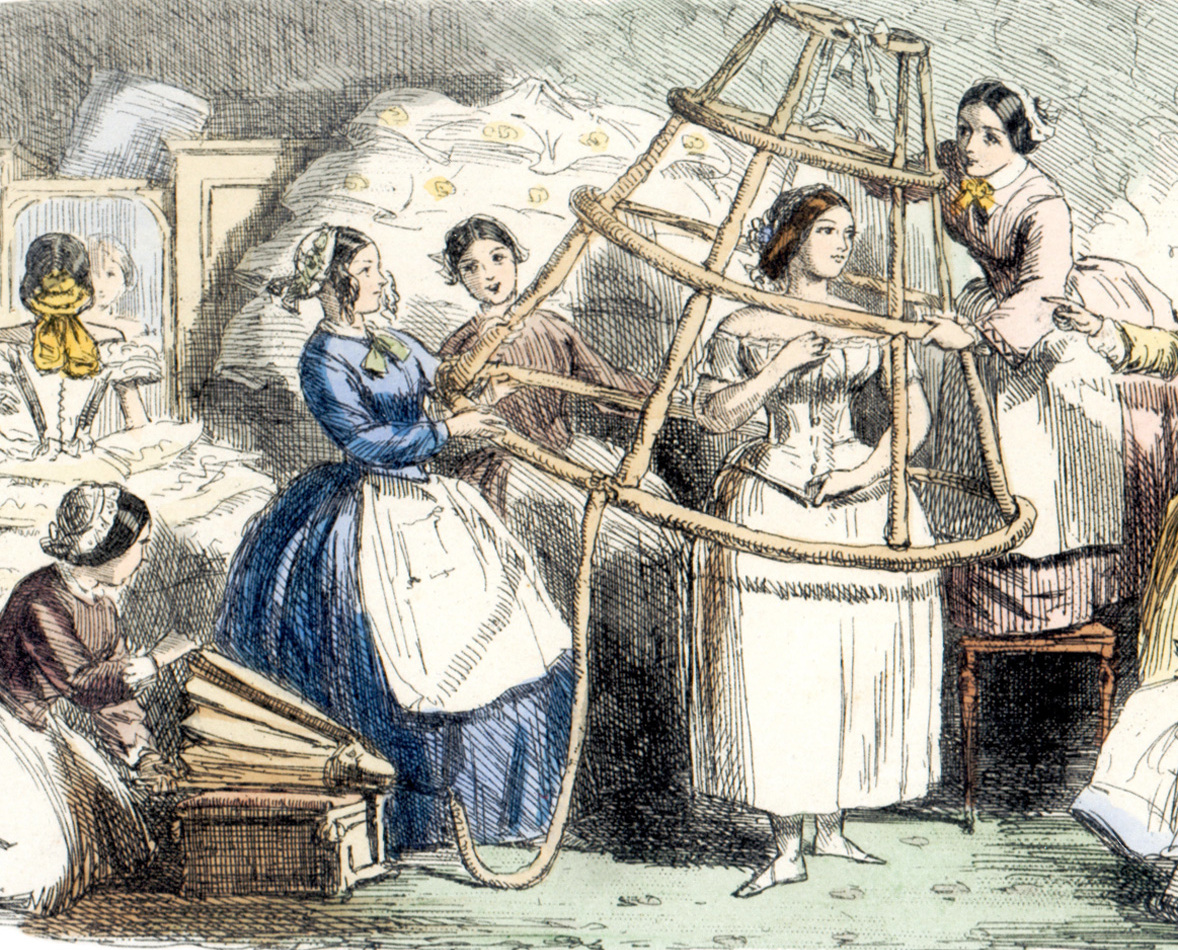
Inflatable crinoline. 1857 caricature by John Leech for Punch's Pocket Book

The crinoline needed to be rigid enough to support the skirts in their accustomed shape, but also flexible enough to be temporarily pressed out of shape and spring back afterwards. Other materials used for crinolines included whalebone, gutta-percha, and vulcanised caoutchouc (natural rubber). The idea of inflatable hoops was short-lived as they were easily punctured, prone to collapse, and due to the use of brimstone in the manufacture of rubber, they smelled unpleasant. Although hard rubber hoops of gutta-percha worked satisfactorily at first, they were brittle and easily crushed without recovering their form. Despite objections that the sharp points of snapped steels were hazardous, lightweight steel was clearly the most successful option. It reduced the number of petticoats and their weight, and offered increased freedom of movement of the legs. However, hasty or careless movements in a hoop skirt could lead to accidentally revealing more than intended. An advertisement published in The Lady's Newspaper in 1863 for a cage crinoline with waved hoops attempted to reassure the potential customer that while wearing it, activities such as climbing stairs, passing to her theatre seat, dropping into armchairs, and leaning against furniture would be possible without hindrance either to herself or to others around her.

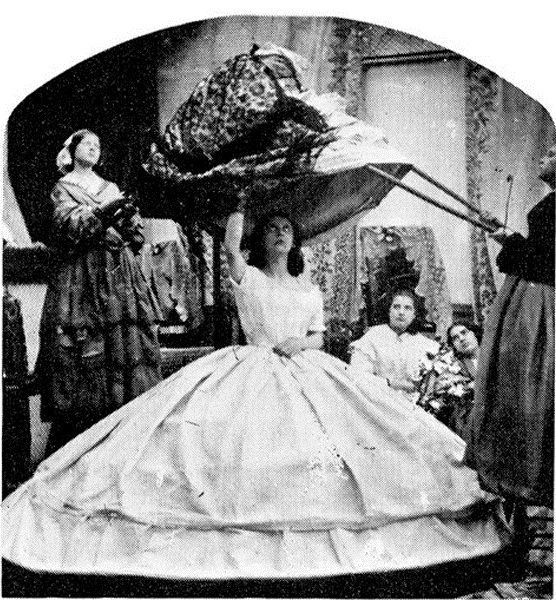
Comic photograph, c. 1860

Despite some claims, such as that by the historian Max von Boehm, that the largest crinolines measured up to 10 yards (30 ft) around, the photo-historian Alison Gernsheim concluded that the maximum realistic circumference was in fact between 5.5–6 yards (5.0–5.5 m). Whilst a loosely gathered skirt draped over a large hoop would certainly require a higher yardage, Gernsheim noted that 10 yards (9.1 m) hems were highly improbable. Staged photographs showing women wearing exaggeratedly large crinolines were quite popular, such as a widely published sequence of five stereoscope views showing a woman dressing with the assistance of several maids who require long poles to lift her dress over her head and other ingenious means of navigating her enormous hoopskirt. Such photographs, which re-enacted contemporary caricatures rather than accurately reflecting reality, were aimed towards the voyeur's market. However, it was a fact that the size of the crinoline often caused difficulties in passing through doors, boarding carriages and generally moving about. By the late 1860s many crinolines were of a significantly reduced size, as noted by a Victoria and Albert Museum curator observing the sizes of cage crinolines in the museum's collection.

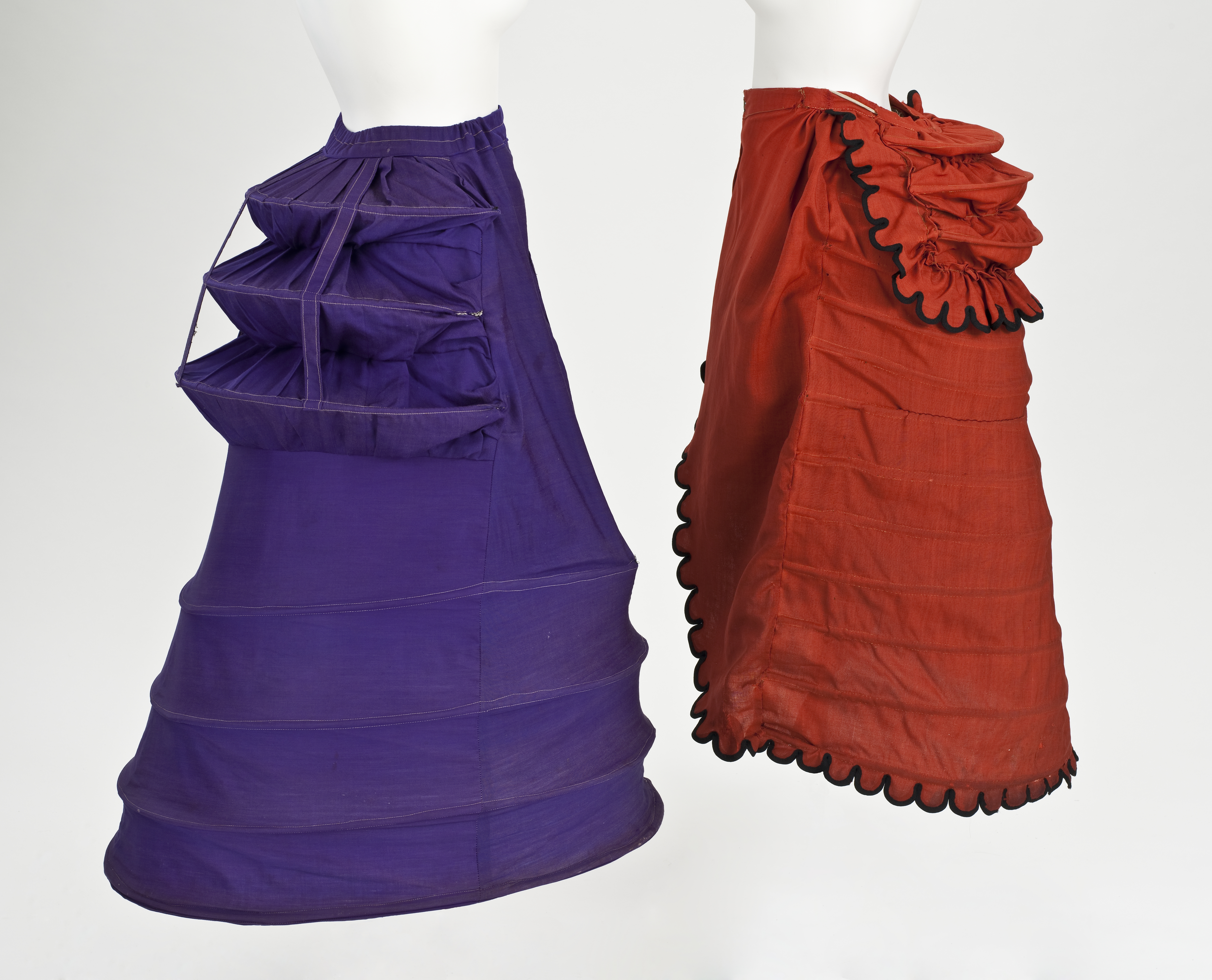
Two English crinolettes, 1872–75 (LACMA)

=== Crinolettes and 1880s revival ===
The crinoline began to fall out of fashion from about 1866. A modified version, the crinolette, was a transitional garment bridging the gap between the cage crinoline and the bustle. Fashionable from 1867 through to the mid-1870s, the crinolette was typically composed of half-hoops, sometimes with internal lacing or ties designed to allow adjustment of fullness and shape. The crinolette was still worn in the early 1880s, with an 1881 article describing it as sticking out solely behind, as opposed to projecting "hideously at the side" like the crinoline. It is possible that some of the smaller crinolines that survive were worn in combination with separate bustles, rather than in isolation. During the 1880s the cage crinoline was revived, with hoop petticoats designed to accommodate the extremely large bustles of the period and support the skirt hems. One of the mid-1880s styles was called the lobster pot due to its resemblance to a lobster trap. Due to the extreme weight of the fabrics of the decade, the hoops of the crinolines were crossed over each other behind the legs in order to support and hold the skirts firmly in place. As with the earlier cage crinolines, sprung steel, wire and cane were used.

=== Critical response ===
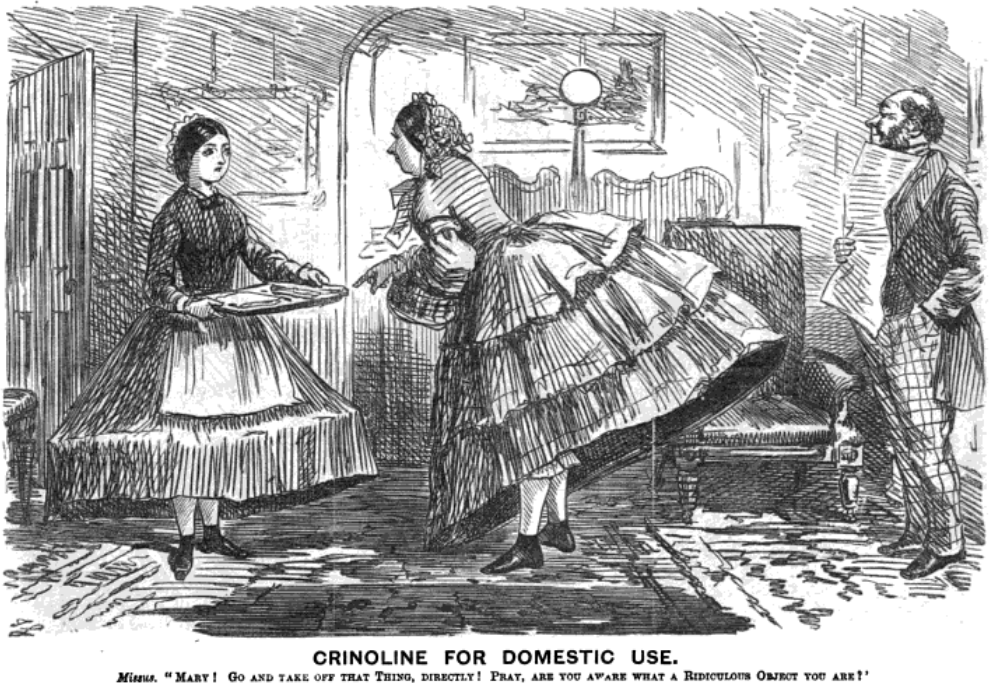
Caricature showing a lady scolding her maid for wearing a crinoline. Punch, 1862

Unlike the farthingales and panniers, the crinoline was worn by women of every social class. The fashion swiftly became the subject of intense scrutiny in Western media. Critical articles on the crinoline were published by the Hungarian journal Az Üstökös (1858) and the Bulgarian journalist Petko Slaveykov in 1864. In the 1850s, the Welsh poet Dafydd Jones wrote a ballad decrying the fashion. A similar sentiment was expressed by a Russian song published in 1854, where the singer complains about his wife having assumed the fashion. In 1855, an observer of Queen Victoria's state visit to Paris complained that despite the number of foreigners present, Western fashions such as the crinoline had diluted national dress to such an extent that everyone, whether Turkish, Scottish, Spanish, or Tyrolean, dressed alike. Victoria herself is popularly said to have detested the fashion, inspiring a song in Punch that started: "Long live our gracious Queen/Who won't wear crinoline!" Gernsheim has noted that the Queen was often photographed in crinolines, and suggests that this misunderstanding came from a request made by Victoria that female guests attending her daughter's marriage in 1858 should leave their hoops off due to limited space in the Chapel Royal at St James's Palace.

The crinoline was perceived as a signifier of social identity, with a popular subject for cartoons being that of maids wearing crinolines like their mistresses, much to the higher-class ladies' disapproval. The questions of servants in crinoline and the related social concerns were raised by George Routledge in an etiquette manual published in 1875, where he criticised London housemaids for wearing hoops at work. As the girls knelt to scrub the doorsteps, Routledge described how their hoops rose to expose their lower bodies, inspiring street harassment from errand boys and other male passers-by. Routledge firmly opined that servants ought to save their fashionable garments for their leisure periods, and dress appropriately for their work. However, this was challenged by some servants who saw attempts to control their dress as equivalent to controlling their liberty, and refused to work for employers who tried to forbid crinolines.

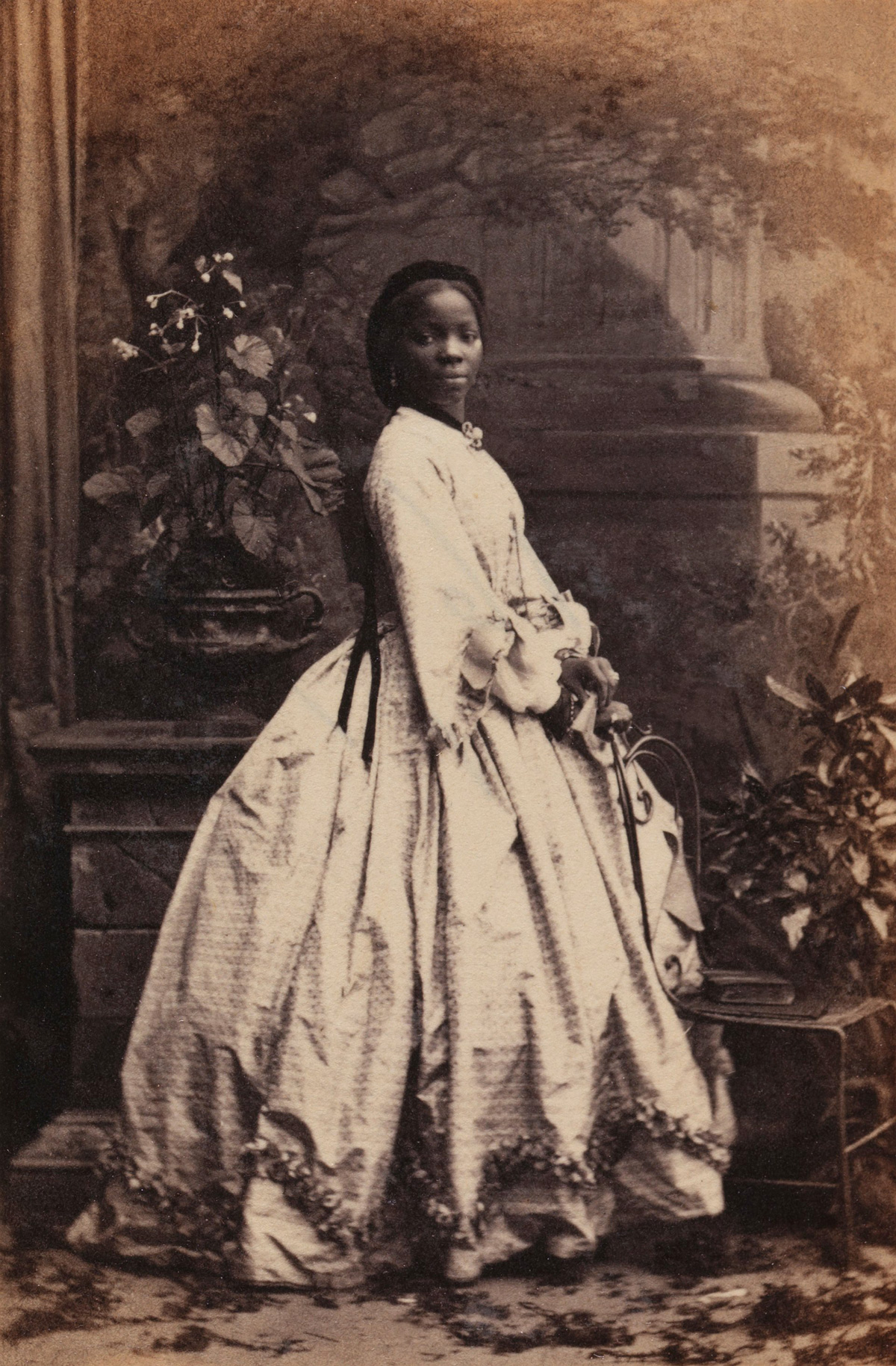
Sarah Forbes Bonetta by Camille Silvy, 1862

Arthur Munby observed that in the "barbarous locality" of Wigan, the sight of a female colliery worker wearing trousers was "not half as odd as a woman wearing a crinoline." In Australia, poorer rural women were photographed posing outside their slab huts, wearing their best dresses with crinolines. The French sociologist and economist Frédéric le Play carried out surveys of French working-class families' wardrobes from 1850 to 1875, in which he found that two women had crinolines in their wardrobe, both wives of skilled workers. One, the fashion-conscious wife of a glove-maker, owned two crinolines and eleven dresses, although her usual everyday clothing consisted of wooden shoes and printed aprons. In America, the mid-19th century crinoline has become popularly associated with the image of the Southern Belle, a young woman from the American Deep South's upper socioeconomic, slave-owning planter classes. However, as in Europe and elsewhere, the crinoline was far from exclusively worn by wealthy women. Both black and white women in America of all classes and social standings wore hooped skirts, including First Lady Mary Todd Lincoln and her African-American dressmaker, Elizabeth Keckley, who created many of Lincoln's own extravagant crinolines.

The difficulties associated with the garment, such as its size, the problems and hazards associated with wearing and moving about in it, and the fact that it was worn so widely by women of all social classes, were frequently exaggerated and parodied in satirical articles and illustrations such as those in Punch. Alexander Maxwell has summarised crinoline mockery as expressing the male authors' insecurity and fears that women, whose crinolines took up "enough space for five," would eventually "conquer" mankind. Julia Thomas, observing the extent of Punch's anti-crinoline sentiment and mockery, noted that the magazine's attacks, rather than crushing the fashion, exacerbated and even invented the phenomenon of "crinolinemania."

==== Hazards ====
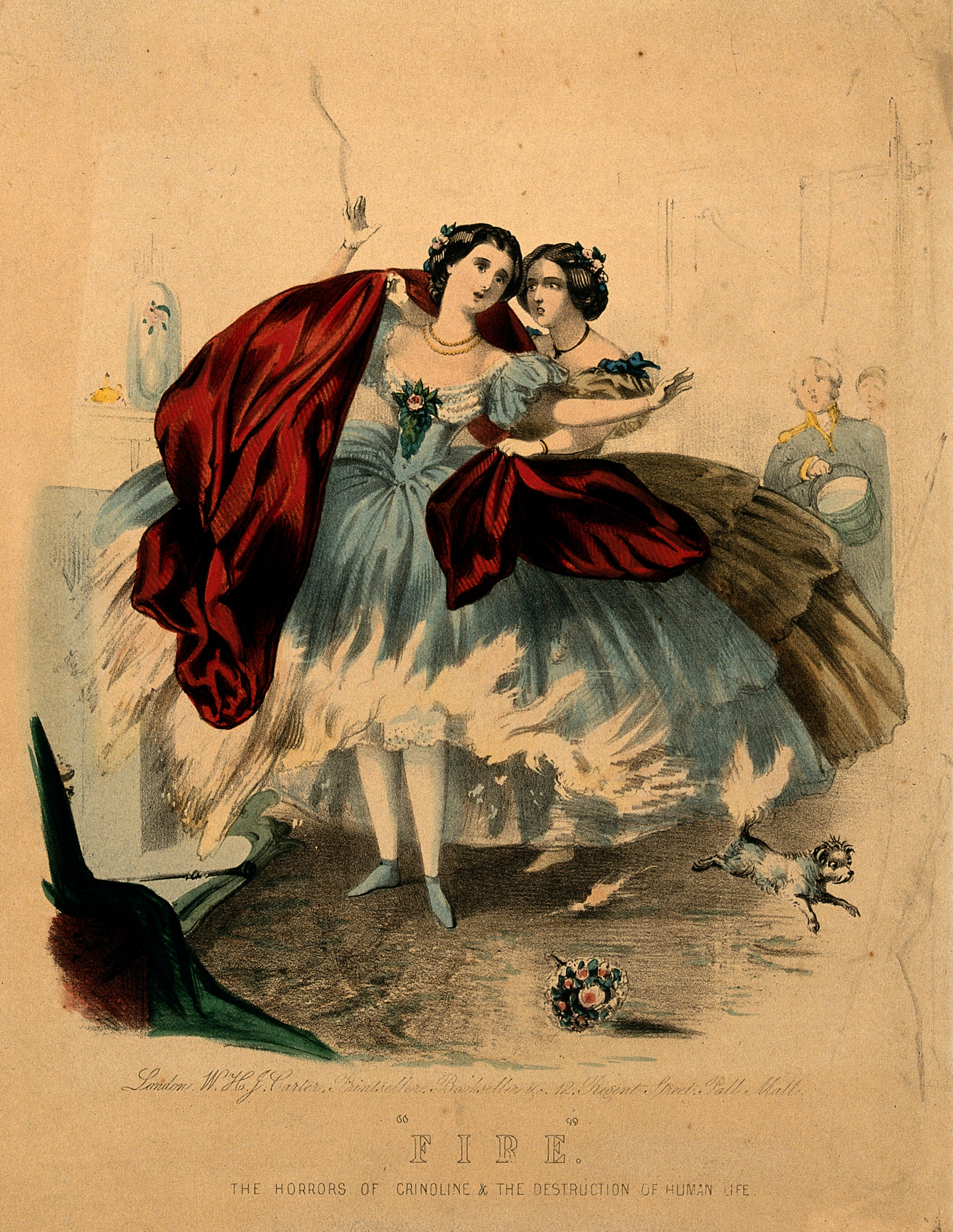
A crinoline fire, c. 1860

The flammability of the crinoline was widely reported. Although trustworthy statistics on crinoline-related fatalities are rare, Florence Nightingale estimated that at least 630 women died from their clothes catching fire in 1863–1864. One such incident, the death of a 14-year-old kitchenmaid called Margaret Davey was reported in The Times on 13 February 1863. Her dress, "distended by a crinoline," ignited as she stood on the fender of the fireplace to reach some spoons on the mantelpiece, and she died as a result of extensive burns. The Deputy-Coroner, commenting that he was "astonished to think that the mortality from such a fashion was not brought more conspicuously under the notice of the Registrar-General," passed a verdict of "Accidental death by fire, caused through crinoline." A similar case was reported later that year, when 16-year-old Emma Musson died after a piece of burning coke rolled from the kitchen fire to ignite her crinoline. A month later, on 8 December 1863, a serious fire at the Church of the Company of Jesus in Santiago, Chile, killed between two and three thousand people. The severity of the death toll is credited in part to the large amounts of flammable fabric that made up the women's crinoline dresses. Two notable victims of crinoline fires were William Wilde's illegitimate daughters, Emily and Mary, who died in November 1871 of burns sustained after their gowns caught fire. Although flame-retardant fabrics were available, these were thought unattractive and were unpopular.

Other risks associated with the crinoline were that it could get caught in other people's feet, carriage wheels or furniture, or be caught by sudden gusts of wind, blowing the wearer off her feet. In 1859, while participating in a paper chase, Louisa, Duchess of Manchester, caught her hoop while climbing over a stile, and was left with the entirety of her crinoline and skirts thrown over her head, revealing her scarlet drawers to the assembled company.

The crinoline was worn by some factory workers, leading to the textiles firm Courtaulds instructing female employees in 1860 to leave their hoops and crinolines at home. Cecil Willett Cunnington described seeing a photograph of female employees in the Bryant and May match factories wearing crinolines while at work. A report in The Cork Examiner of 2 June 1864 recorded the death of Ann Rollinson from injuries sustained after her crinoline was caught by a revolving machinery shaft in a mangling room at Firwood bleach works.

== 20th century ==
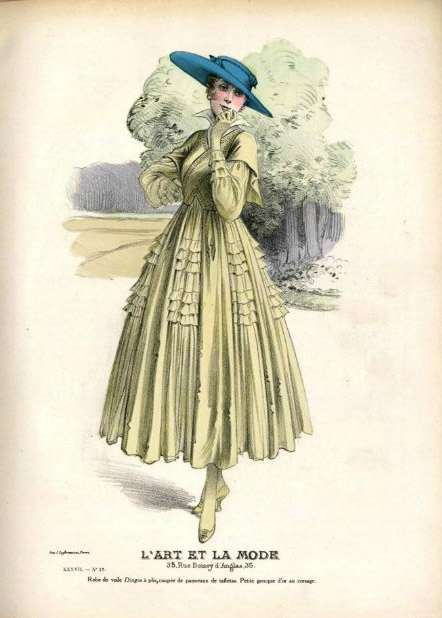
War crinoline, 1916

During World War I, the "war crinoline" became fashionable, between 1915 and 1917. This style featured wide, full mid-calf length skirts, and was described as practical (for enabling freedom of walking and movement) and patriotic, as the sight of attractively dressed women was expected to cheer up soldiers on leave. The full skirts of the war crinoline endured in the robe de style of the 1920s.

In the late 1930s, just before the outbreak of World War II, there was a revival of the hooped crinoline from designers such as Edward Molyneux, who put hoops in both day skirts and evening gowns, and Norman Hartnell, whose late 1930s Winterhalter-inspired crinoline designs for Queen Elizabeth The Queen Mother were so successful that the Queen is popularly (if inaccurately) credited with having single-handedly brought crinolines back into fashion. Both as Queen, and as the Queen Mother, Elizabeth adopted the traditional bell-shaped crinoline as her signature look for evening wear and state occasions. The film Gone with the Wind, released in 1939, inspired the American fashion for prom dresses with crinolines in Spring 1940.

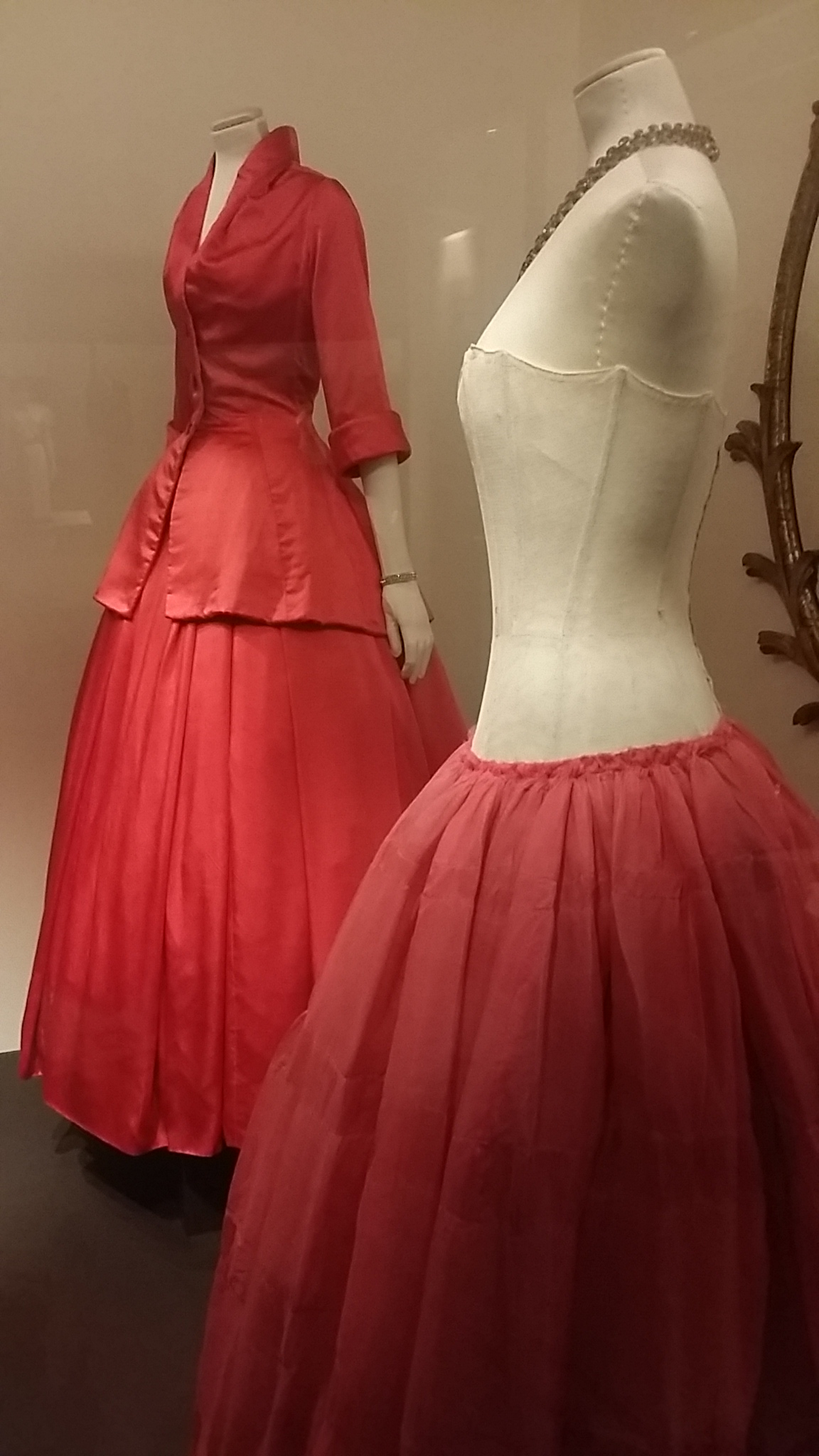
Dior evening gown and crinoline petticoat, 1954 (V&A)

Following World War II, crinolines were once again revived by designers such as Christian Dior, whose 1947 "New Look" featured full skirts supported by stiffened underskirts. Loschek has suggested that, by explicitly referencing the Belle Époque era and reviving historic styles of corsets and crinolines in his "New Look," Dior was the first designer to introduce the idea of postmodernism to fashion, albeit unconsciously. Crinolines were popular throughout the 1950s and into the early 1960s. These were sold in some clothing stores as late as 1970.

The American designer Anne Fogarty was particularly noted for her full-skirted designs worn over crinoline petticoats, which were always separate garments from the dress to enable ease of movement and travelling. Life reported in 1953 on how one of Fogarty's crinoline designs from 1951 was almost exactly duplicated by a design in Dior's latest collection. Hooped, tiered and/or ruffled crinoline petticoats in nylon, net and cotton were widely worn, as were skirts with integrated hoops.

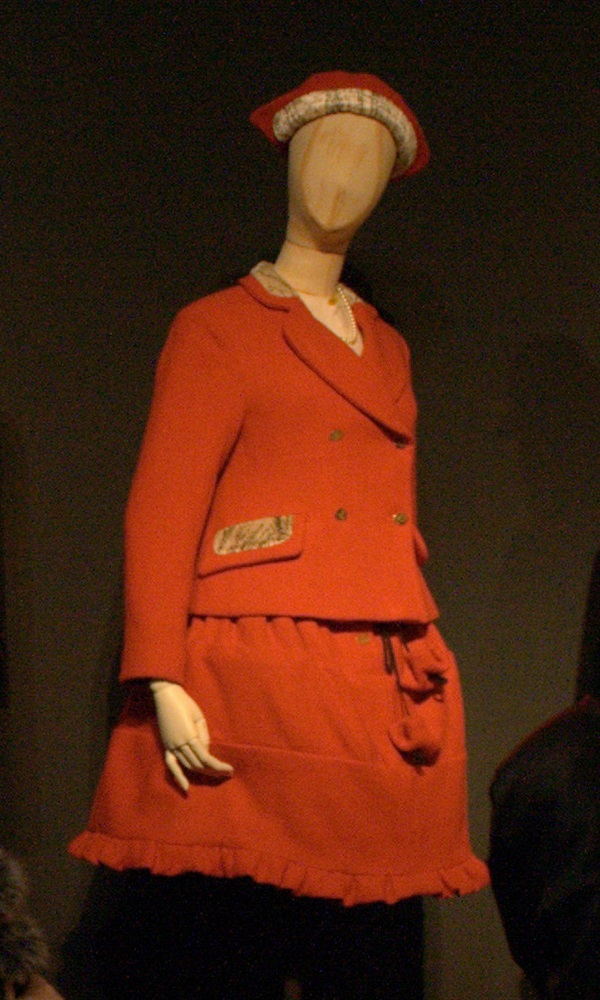
Westwood's 'mini-crini', 1987

In the mid-1980s Vivienne Westwood revisited the crinoline, taking inspiration from the ballet Petrushka to produce miniskirt length versions that she christened the "mini-crini." The mini-crini silhouette influenced the work of other designers such as Christian Lacroix's "puffball" skirts. The Westwood mini-crini was described in 1989 as a combination of two conflicting ideals – the crinoline, representing a "mythology of restriction and encumbrance," and the miniskirt, representing an "mythology of liberation."

Late 20th- and early 21st-century fashion designers such as Alexander McQueen and John Galliano often used crinolines in their designs, with the skirt of one of Galliano's ballgowns for Dior in 1998 reaching a width of 9 feet. Galliano specifically visited the original crinoline manufacturers that Christian Dior himself had used in order to inform and influence his own designs. McQueen was fascinated by the crinoline and often referenced it in his collections, cutting away leather ballgowns to reveal the cage beneath, or making it out of silver-decorated cut metal. One of McQueen's most notable crinoline designs was modelled by the amputee model Aimee Mullins in a series of photographs by Nick Knight for Dazed and Confused, in which Mullin's cage crinoline, deliberately worn without overskirts in order to reveal her prosthetic legs, was described as suggesting both a walking frame and a cage to "contain the unruliness of the unwhole". The images from this shoot were declared among the most significant commercial images of 1998, representing Knight and McQueen's dedication to presenting alternatives to the traditional concepts of fashion and physical beauty. After McQueen's death in 2010, his successor, Sarah Burton, continued the tradition of designing crinolines for the McQueen brand.

== 21st century ==
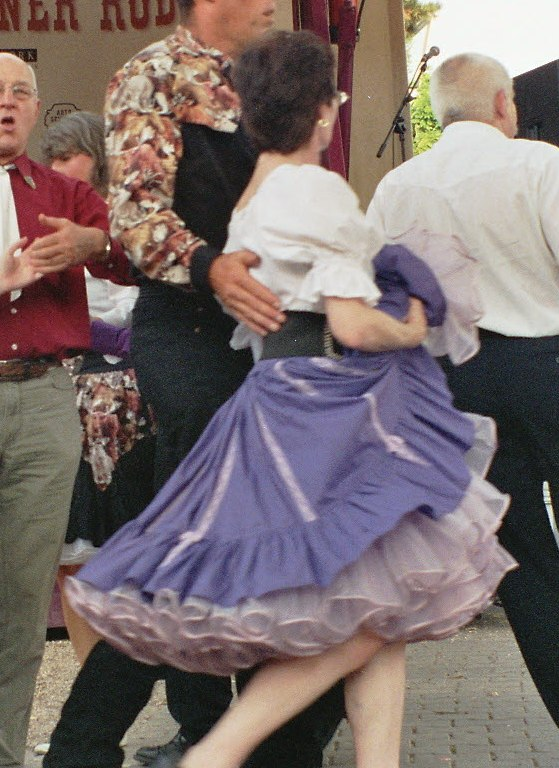
Square dancer, 2006

Crinolines continue to be worn well into the 21st century, typically as part of formal outfits such as evening gowns, prom dresses, quinceañera dresses, and wedding dresses. 1950s/1960s/early 1970s-style net crinolines are a traditional element of costumes for square dancing and clogging. They are also popular garments for attending 1950s and 1960s influenced rockabilly events such as Viva Las Vegas. The steampunk movement has also appropriated cage crinolines along with other elements of 19th century fashion such as corsets and the top hat for its costuming.

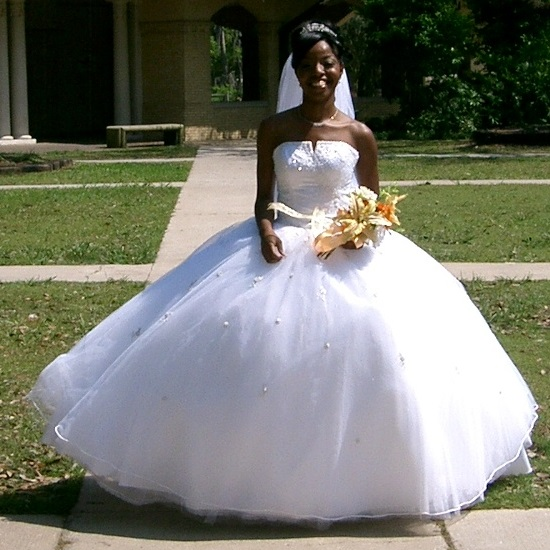
Wedding dress, 2005

In some contexts, the traditional hooped crinoline may be seen as controversial, as in early 2015 when the University of Georgia reportedly requested hoop skirts not be worn to certain fraternity events due to their perceived association with Southern Belles and the slave-owning, upper socioeconomic classes of the American Deep South. The reason for the proposed ban was linked to the SAE racism incident earlier that year, with several articles noting it was a well-intentioned attempt to avoid the University of Georgia fraternities facing charges of racial insensitivity. It was noted that hoop skirts and crinolines had been worn by both black and white women of all classes and social standings during the historical period in question, and that despite popular associations, they were not exclusive to the image of the Southern Belle.

== Bibliography ==
- Anonymous (November 1858). "Crinoline and Whales". Dublin University Magazine: A Literary and Political Journal. 52. W. Curry, jr. and Company: 537–551.
- Bancroft, Alison (2011). Fashion and psychoanalysis : styling the self. London: I.B. Tauris. ISBN 9781780760049.
- Barnard, Malcolm (2013). Fashion as Communication (2, revised ed.). Routledge. ISBN 978-1136413049.
- Blau, Herbert (1999). Nothing in itself : complexions of fashion. Bloomington, Ind.: Indiana Univ. Press. ISBN 9780253335876.
- Breward, Christopher (2003). "Crinoline and aniline, symbols of progress". The culture of fashion : a new history of fashionable dress (Repr. ed.). Manchester: Manchester University Press. pp. 157–160. ISBN 9780719041259.
- Cleland, Liza; Davies, Glenys; Llewellyn-Jones, Lloyd (2007). Greek and Roman Dress from A to Z. Routledge. ISBN 9781134589166.
- Crane, Diana (2012). "Working-Class Clothing and the Experience of Social Class in the Nineteenth Century: Clothing Behaviour and Working-Class Women in France". Fashion and Its Social Agendas: Class, Gender, and Identity in Clothing. University of Chicago Press. pp. 48–58. ISBN 9780226924830.
- Cunnington, C. Willett (1937). English women's clothing in the nineteenth century a comprehensive guide with 1,117 illustrations. New York: Dover Publications (1990 reprint). ISBN 9780486319636.
- Cunnington, C. Willett; Cunnington, Phillis (1992). The history of underclothes. New York: Dover Pub. ISBN 9780486319780.
- Cumming, Valerie (1989). Royal dress : the image and the reality 1580 to the present day. London: Batsford. p. 176. ISBN 9780713444872.
- D'Alleva, Anne (2008). "Body Adornment and Clothing: Comparative History". In Smith, Bonnie G. (ed.). The Oxford encyclopedia of women in world history. Oxford [England]: Oxford University Press. ISBN 9780195148909.
- Ewing, Elizabeth (2010). Fashion in underwear : from Babylon to bikini briefs (Dover ed.). Mineola, N.Y.: Dover Publications. ISBN 9780486476490.
- Evans, Caroline (2004). "Cultural Capital 1976–2000". In Breward, Christopher; Ehrman, Edwina; Evans, Caroline (eds.). The London look : fashion from street to catwalk. New Haven: Yale University Press / Museum of London. ISBN 9780300103991.
- Evans, Caroline; Thornton, Minna (1989). Women and Fashion: A New Look. London: Quartet Books. pp. 148–150. ISBN 9780704326910.
- Flecker, Lara (2013). A Practical Guide to Costume Mounting. Routledge. ISBN 978-1136431951.
- Gernsheim, Alison (1981). "The Rise and Fall of the Crinoline". Victorian & Edwardian fashion: a photographic survey. New York: Dover Publications. ISBN 9780486319131.
- Gleason, Katherine; Jeter, K. W. (2013). The anatomy of steampunk : the fashion of Victorian futurism ([2013 ed.] ed.). New York, N.Y.: Race Point Pub. ISBN 9781937994280.
- Glynn, Prudence (1978). In fashion : dress in the twentieth century. New York: Oxford University Press. ISBN 9780195200720.
- Ginsburg, Madeleine (1988). Victorian dress in photographs. London: Batsford. ISBN 9780713460384.
- Glotz, G. (1996). The Aegean civilization. London: Routledge. ISBN 9781136195303.
- Hill, Daniel Delis (2007). As seen in Vogue : a century of American fashion in advertising (1. pbk. print. ed.). Lubbock, Tex.: Texas Tech University Press. ISBN 9780896726161.
- Johnston, Lucy (24 June 2011). "Crinolines, Crinolettes, Bustles and Corsets from 1860–80". Victoria and Albert Museum. Archived from the original on 6 August 2017.
- Johnston, Lucy (20 June 2011). "Corsets and Crinoline". Victoria and Albert Museum. Archived from the original on 14 February 2017.
- Koda, Harold (2003). Extreme beauty : the body transformed (3. printing ed.). New York: Metropolitan Museum of Art. ISBN 9780300103120.
- Lehnert, Gertrud (2000). A history of fashion in the 20th century. Cologne: Könemann. ISBN 9783829020336.
- Loschek, Ingrid (2009). When clothes become fashion : design and innovation systems (English ed.). Oxford: Berg. ISBN 9781847883667.
- Martin, Richard; Koda, Harold (1993). Infra-apparel. New York: Metropolitan Museum of Art. ISBN 9780870996764.
- Marly, Diana de (1990). Worth : father of haute couture (2nd ed.). New York: Holmes & Meier. ISBN 9780841912427.
- Maxwell, Alexander (2014). "Fashion as a Social Problem". Patriots Against Fashion: Clothing and Nationalism in Europe's Age of Revolutions. Palgrave Macmillan. ISBN 978-1137277145.
- Maynard, Margaret (1994). Fashioned from penury : dress as cultural practice in colonial Australia (1. publ. ed.). Cambridge u.a.: Cambridge Univ. Press. ISBN 9780521453103.
- Milbank, Caroline Rennolds (1989). New York Fashion: The Evolution of American Style. Abrams. ISBN 0810913887.
- Milford-Cottam, Daniel (2014). Edwardian fashion. Oxford: Shire. ISBN 9780747814047.
- Polan, Brenda; Tredre, Roger (2009). The great fashion designers (English ed.). Oxford: Berg. ISBN 9781847882271.
- Routledge, George (1875). The Well-Bred Person's Book of Etiquette. New York: The History Press (2013 reprint). ISBN 9780752496504.
- Steele, Valerie, ed. (2005). Encyclopedia of clothing and fashion. Detroit [u.a.]: Thomson Gale. ISBN 9780684313955.
- Steele, Valerie (1988). Paris fashion : a cultural history. New York: Oxford University Press. ISBN 9780195044652.
- Thomas, Julia (2004). "Crinolinemania: Punch's Female Tragedy". Pictorial Victorians : the inscription of values in word and image. Athens: Ohio Univ. Press. pp. 77–104. ISBN 9780821415917.
- Wace, A. J. B. (2014). A Cretan Statuette in the Fitzwilliam Museum. Cambridge Univ Press, originally published 1927. ISBN 9781107664388.
- Waloschek, Karen; Morris, Ting (2000). Seeling, Charlotte (ed.). Fashion : the century of the designer : 1900–1999 (English ed.). Cologne: Könemann. ISBN 9783829029803.
- Watt, Judith (2012). Fashion: The Ultimate Book of Costume and Style. Dorling Kindersley Ltd. ISBN 978-1409322412.
- Waugh, Norah (2015). Corsets and Crinolines. Routledge. ISBN 9781135874094.
- Williams, Kim; Laing, Jennifer; Frost, Warwick (2014). Fashion, design and events. Routledge. ISBN 9781136238888.
- Wosk, Julie (2001). Women and the machine : representations from the spinning wheel to the electronic age. Baltimore, Md.: Johns Hopkins University Press. ISBN 9780801873133.
- Yarwood, Doreen (2011). Illustrated encyclopedia of world costume (Dover ed.). Mineola, N.Y.: Dover Publications, Inc. pp. 125–127. ISBN 9780486433806.
- Young, William H.; Young, Nancy K. (2004). The 1950s. Westport, Conn.: Greenwood Press. ISBN 9780313323935.
