= Fuyao (fashion) =

Ancient Chinese concept related to fashion with a negative connotation

Chinese name
- Chinese: 福耀
Transcriptions
Standard Mandarin
- Hanyu Pinyin: fúyāo

English name
- English: Fortune and prosperity

Fuyao (Chinese: 福耀; pinyin: fúyào), sometimes translated as Fortune and prosperity in English, is an ancient Chinese concept with a negative connotation which was employed to refer to any garment items or clothing-style which was considered as being "strange clothing style" or "deviant dressing styles", or "aberrance in clothing" when compared to what was considered appropriate in the traditional Chinese clothing, Hanfu, system. It was also associated with fast changes in fashion styles. The concept of fuyao has appeared since the second century BC and its theoretical basis is derived from the Yin and yang principle as well as the Wuxing. The appearance of fuyao clothing was often associated with political and ecological upheaval. This concept of fuyao continued to be used even in the Qing dynasty.

== Cultural significance ==
=== Evil connotation, disaster, and bad omens ===
In ancient China, what was considered an appropriate form of clothing was based on the seasons, occasions, and more importantly the wearer's identity, including social status. The concept of fuyao has appeared since the second century BC in the Shangshu dazhuan《尚書大傳》and already had a negative connotation:

Those whose appearance is not respectful are insufficiently solemn, their arrogance is their culpability, frequent floods are their punishment, for in its extreme this is evil, and then fuyao occurs.

In ancient China, being dressed in fuyao clothing-style was understood as a form of social confusion in the way one dresses himself; for example, being dressed against what was prescribed by the rules and regulations and therefore having no consideration in the distinction between the higher and lower status; or wearing clothing-style which shows transgression in gender and/or sexuality norms. This was also attested in the Zuo Zhuan《左傳》where it is stated that:

Clothing that is inappropriate to one's status will bring disaster to one's person.

Even in the Qing dynasty, fuyao fashion continued to be discussed and be condemned; it also appears in the poem, Qing shi duo《The Bell of Qing Poetry》, written in 1869 by Xia Zhisheng:

(Fuyao) is commonly considered 'evil.' It is caused by people's minds; the evil of clothing [is] the depravity of people's minds. It begins from the hats and shoes, the jackets and collars.

==== Political upheaval ====
Wearing fuyao fashion could also be perceived as being inauspicious as it was associated with political upheaval; this can be found in the Han Shu《漢書》, a source which was most cited in the Qing dynasty, which stated:

When customs are dissolute and disrespectful, then rituals change and political upheaval easily occurs, thus the wearing of strange and frivolous dress creates fuyao.

==== Garment of living people mixed with mourning attire ====
Fuyao could also refer to clothing of living people which had adopted mixed elements from the mourning attire, even when there was the absence a close deceased relative.

==== Blurred distinction between Chinese and non-Chinese fashion ====
The concept of fuyao was also used to invoke garment and apparel which blurred the distinction between Hufu and Hanfu. Xia Zhisheng of the Qing dynasty also explained that fuyao which was mixed non-Chinese fashion was associated with the foretelling of ominous events:

You are not a Uighur, so why is your cap so sharply pointed? You are not in battle, so why is your jacket so short? These things foretell ominous events.

=== Fast changes in fashion ===
The term fuyao could sometimes be used to position a garment or style which popular but contrasting to the traditional style. They could also be associated to shiyang (lit. 'contemporary style'), which referred to garment items which experienced fast changes in styles.

== Characteristics ==
Fashion or clothing-style which were characterized as being fuyao typically had the following characteristics:

1. Form of clothing violates ritual norms and clothing regulations
2. Form of clothing which were extravagant and luxurious,
3. Form of clothing which violated the yin and yang principle, and
4. Strange and inauspicious form of clothing.

== List of fuyao garment or dressing style ==
=== Ming dynasty ===
- Maweiqun was introduced in the Ming dynasty from Joseon; it was considered fuyao as it went against the order of Heaven and Earth.

=== Qing dynasty ===
- In the mid-late Qing dynasty, both officials and scholars lamented that there was an increasing consumption of silk among the members of the lower status, such as actors, courtesans, servants, which was thus considered a fuyao fashion since this behaviour went against the Confucians virtues of frugality and simplicity.

== See also ==
- Hanfu
