= Pannier (clothing) =

Hoopskirt or open framework to extend a skirt's width at the sides

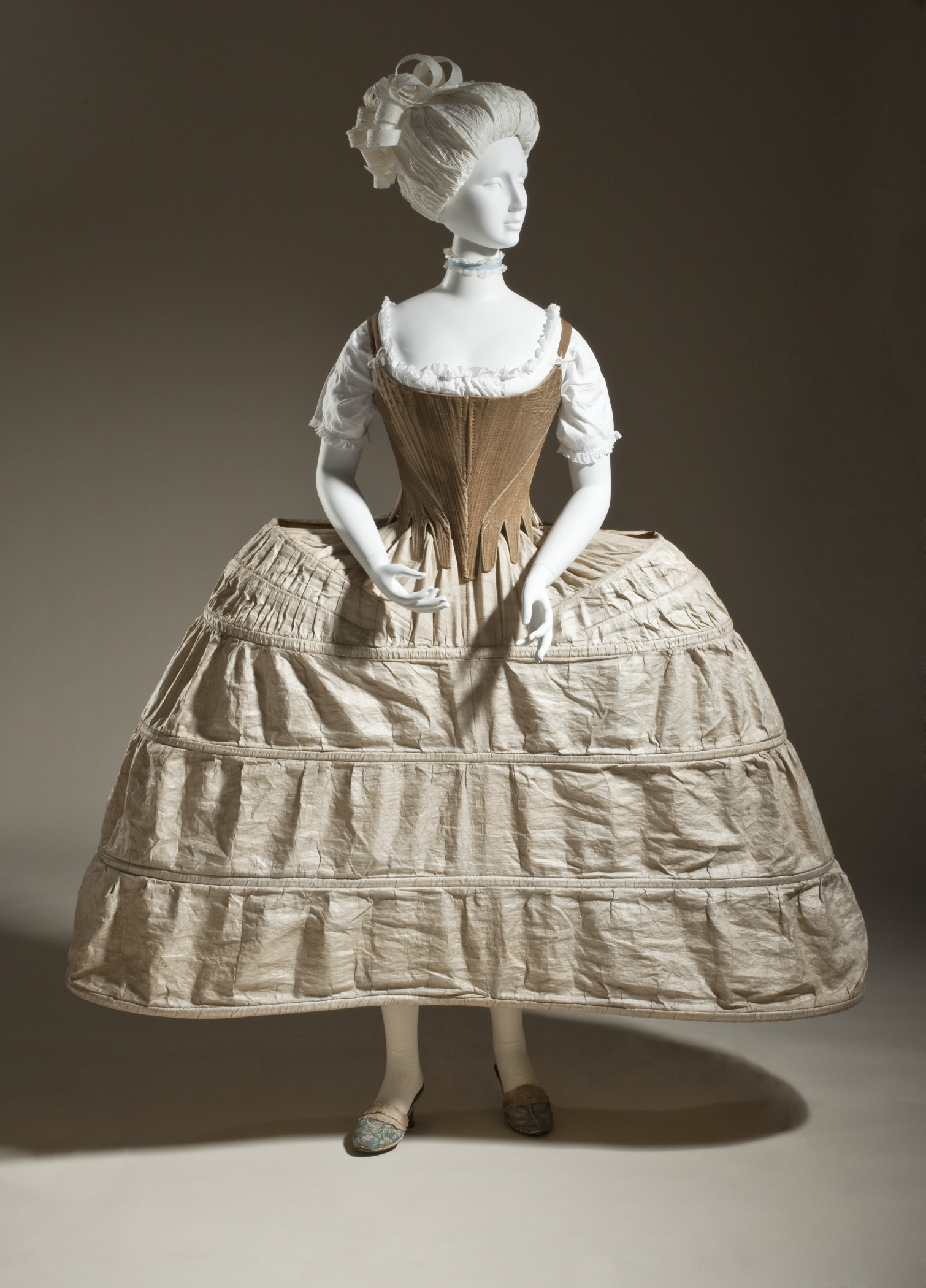
- Pannier or hoop skirt, English, 1750–80. Plain-woven linen and cane.
- Type: Undergarments
- Place of origin: Spain
- Introduced: 17th century

Panniers or side hoops are women's undergarments worn in the 17th and 18th centuries to extend the width of the skirts at the side while leaving the front and back relatively flat. This provided panels where woven patterns, elaborate decorations and rich embroidery could be displayed and fully appreciated.

== History ==
The style originated in Spanish court dress of the 17th century, familiar in portraits by Velázquez. The fashion spread to France and from there to the rest of Europe after c. 1718–1719, when some Spanish dresses had been displayed in Paris. It is also suggested that the pannier originated in Germany or England, having been around since 1710 in England, and appearing in the French court in the last years of Louis XIV’s reign.

The earlier form of the pannier took a shape similar to a 19th-century crinoline. They were wide and domed in circumference. As they developed, they differed from earlier equivalents such as its predecessor, the farthingale of the late 16th century, by not extending equally in all directions, but being very wide at the sides, but not extending as far to the front and back. By the mid-century, the "shoulders" were rather abrupt, not gently curved.

By the mid-18th century, a woman took up three times as much space as a man and always presented an imposing spectacle. At their most extreme, panniers could extend the skirt several feet at each side. By the 1780s, panniers were normally worn only with very formal gowns and within court fashion.

The name comes from panniers, a French term for wicker baskets slung on either side of a pack animal.

== Gallery ==
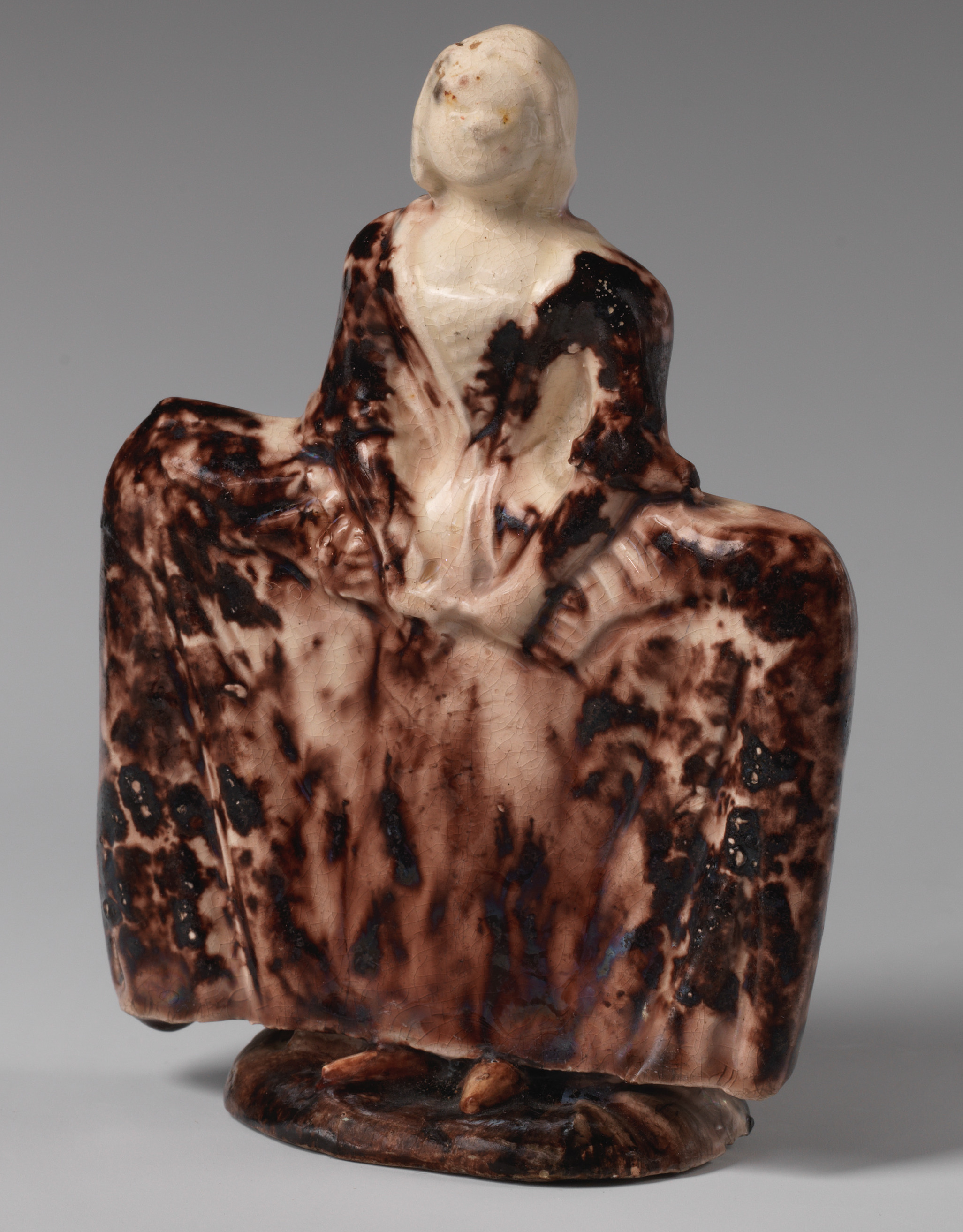
Staffordshire figure, c. 1750

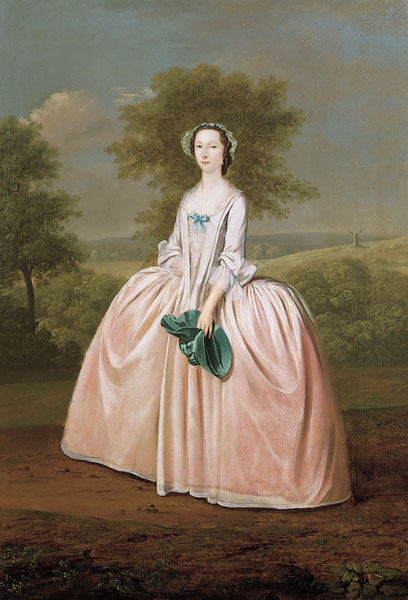
fromTriptych: Mr Peter Ducane, Mary, nee Norris, his wife & The Ducane Children, 1747

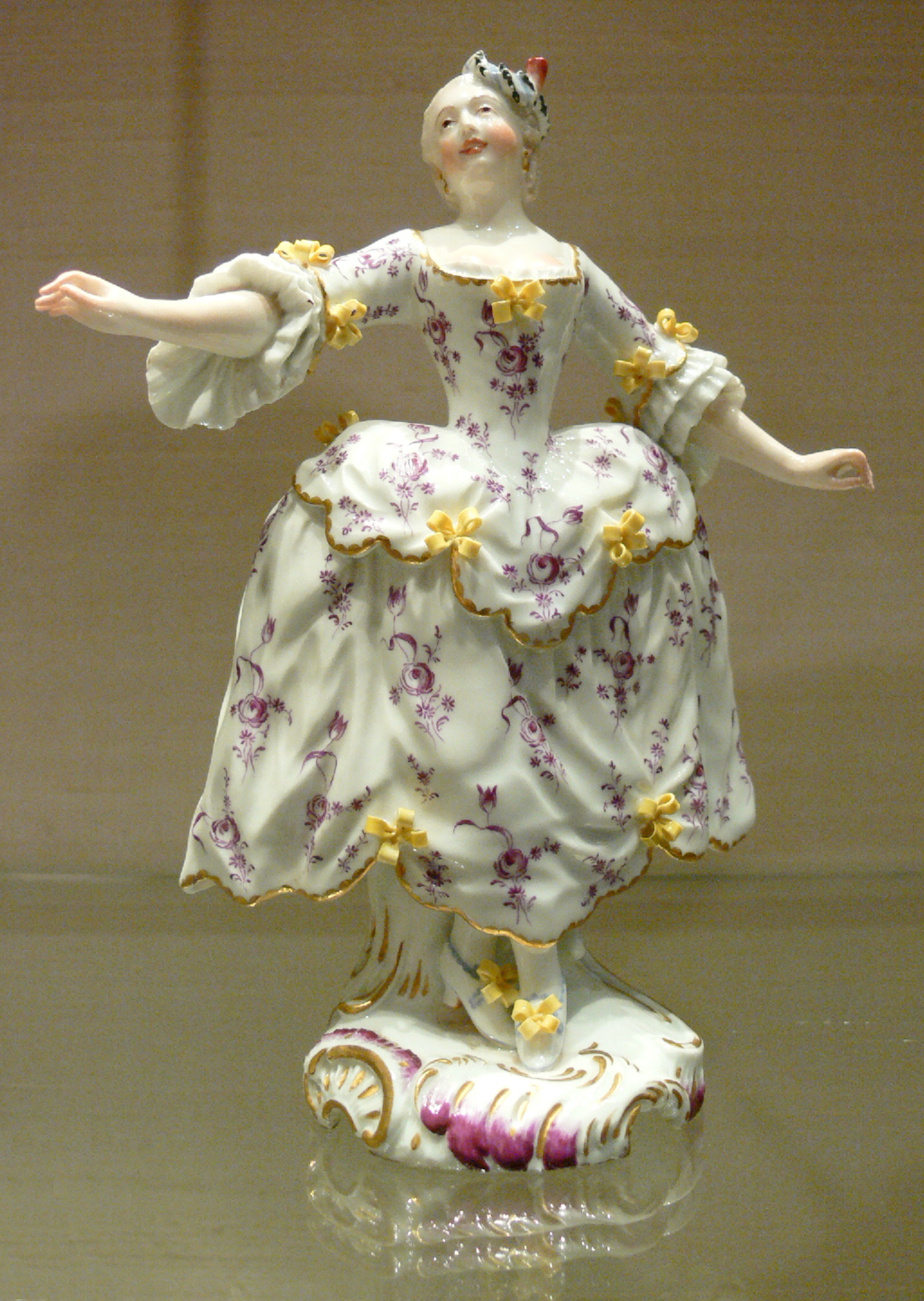
German porcelain ballet dancer wearing a pannier, 1755

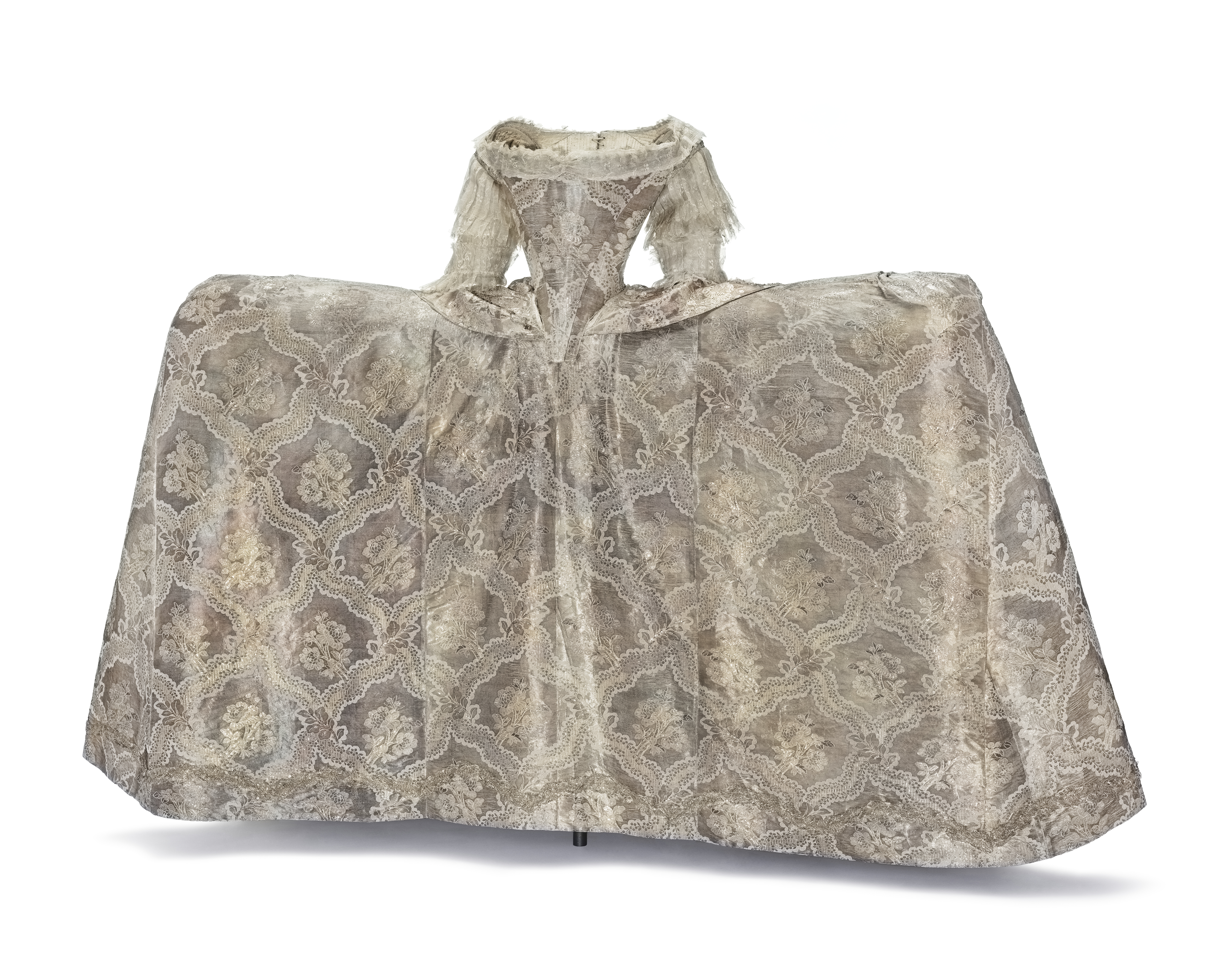
The wedding dress of queen Sophia Magdalena of Sweden, 1766.

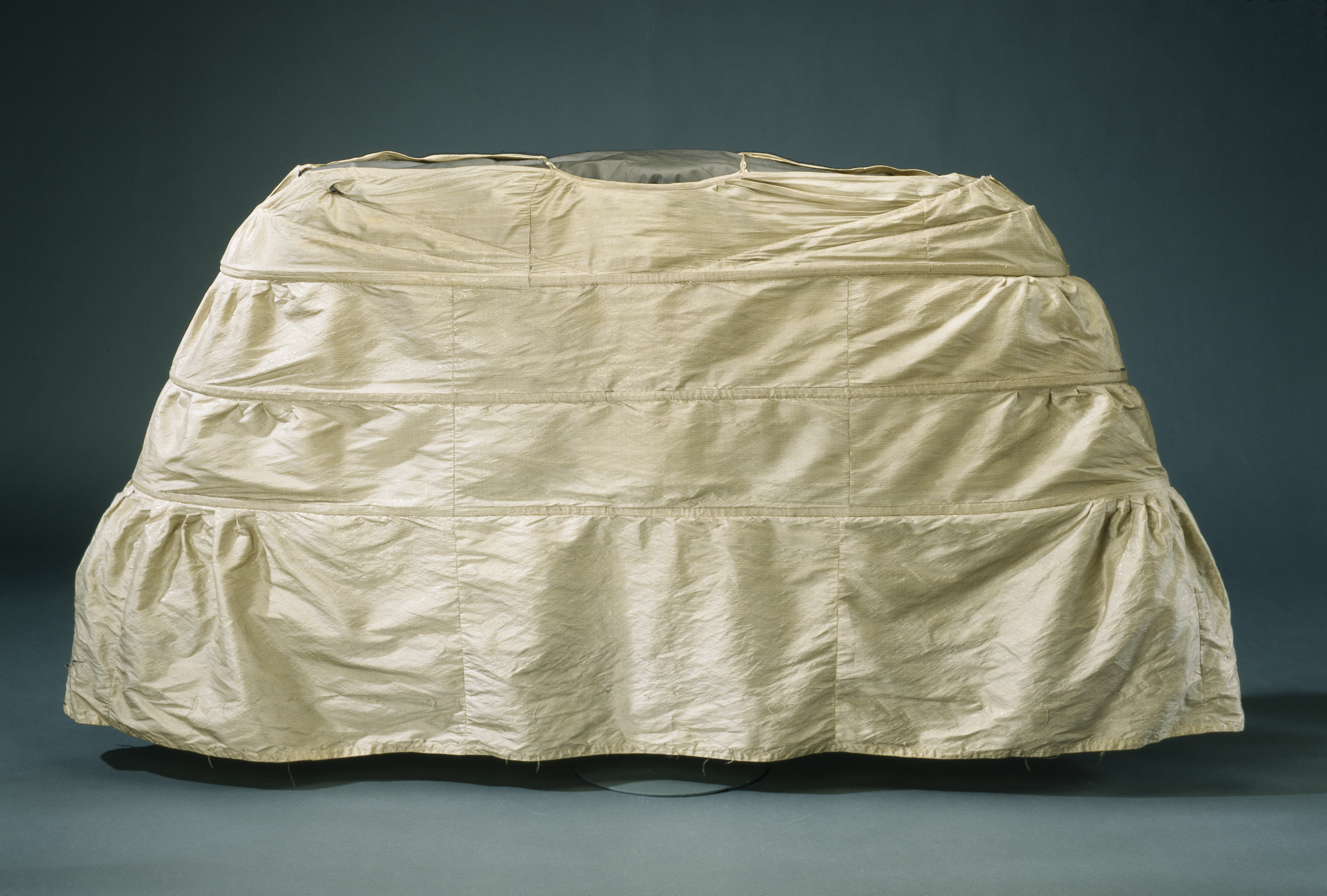
Queen Sophia Magdalena's panniers to her coronation robes, 1772.

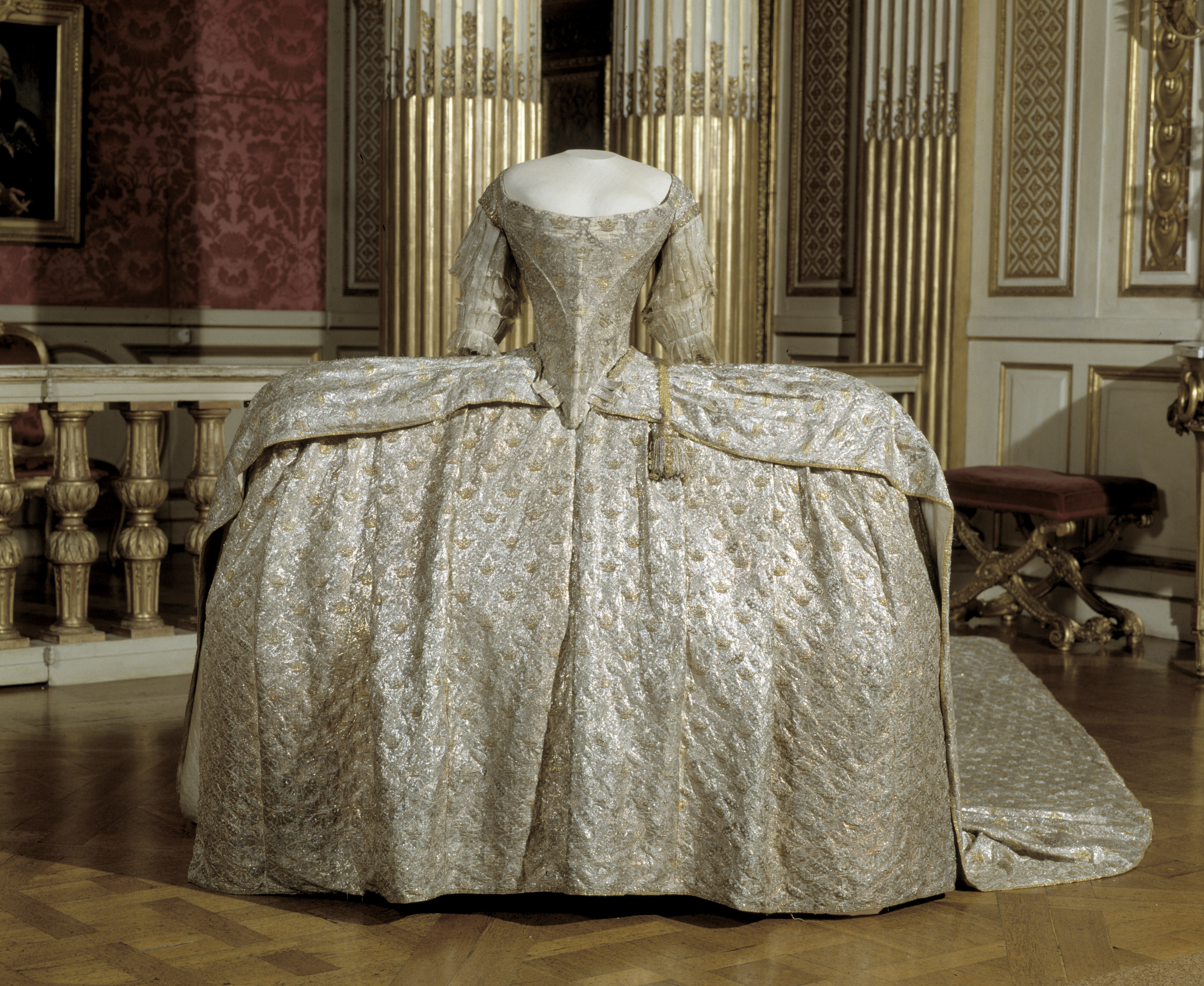
Coronation robes of Sophia Magdalena, 1772.

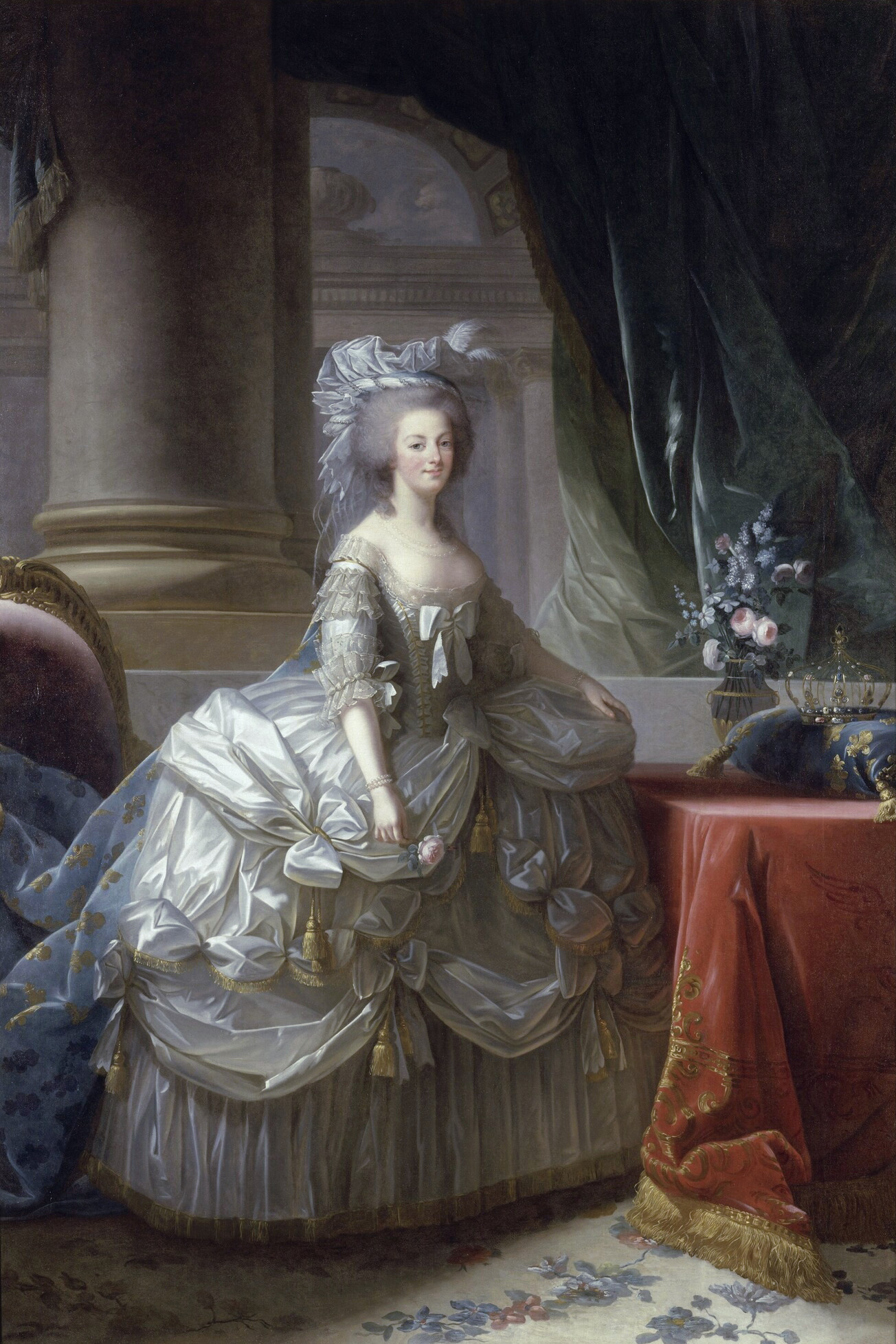
Marie Antoinette in a court dress of 1779 worn over extremely wide panniers.

== See also ==
- 1750–1795 in fashion
- Hoop skirt
