= Sokgot =

Collective noun for various types of traditional Korean undergarments

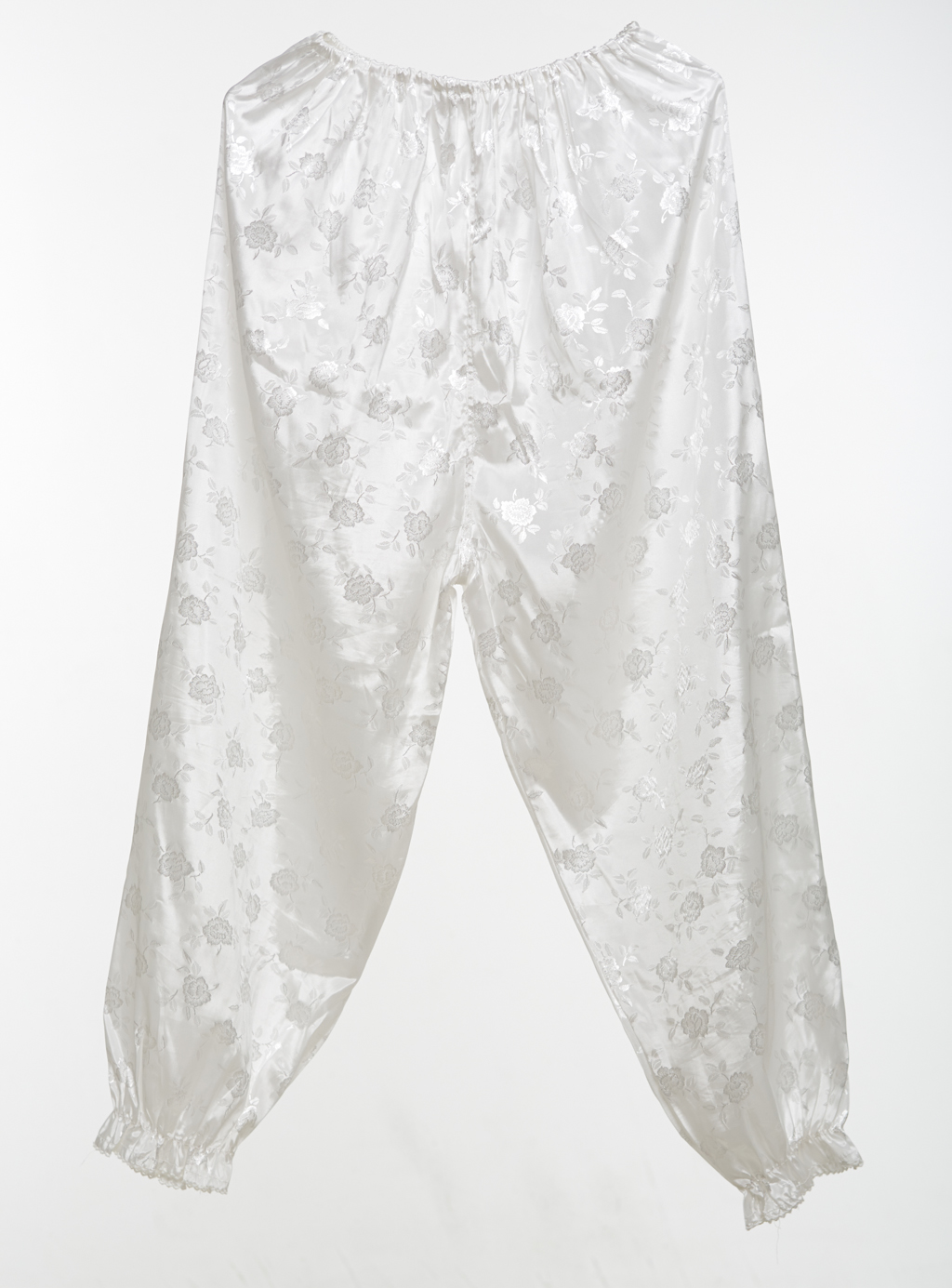
Sokgot

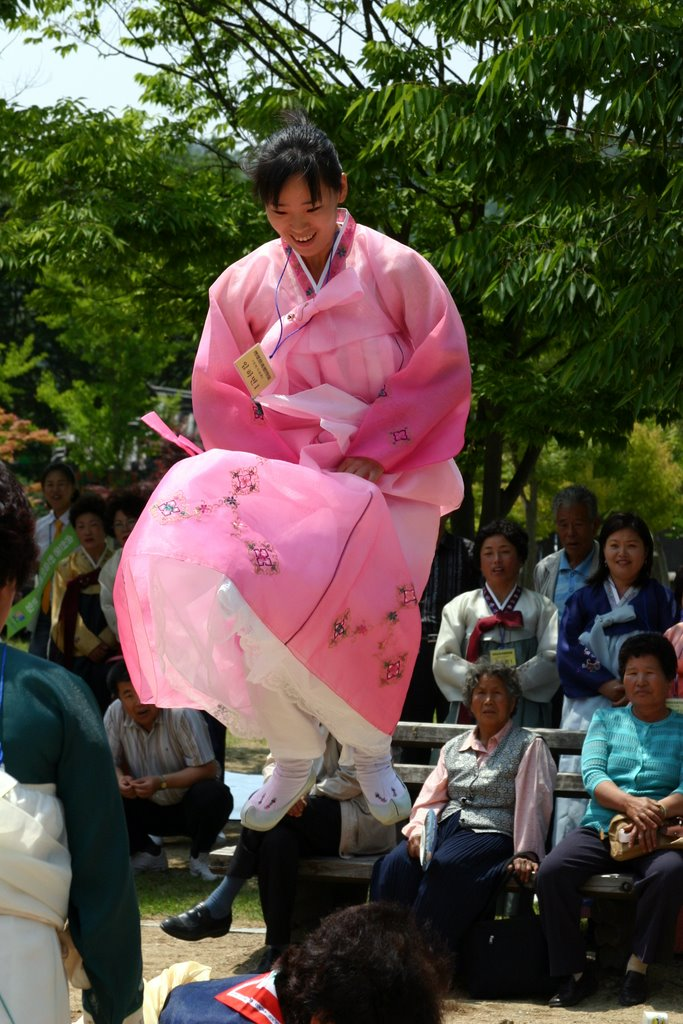
Woman on a nolttwigi: under her chima, layers of sokgot can be seen

Sokgot (속곳) is a collective noun for various types of traditional Korean undergarments. They were worn as part of a hanbok before the import of Western-style underwear. Women usually wore several layers of undergarments, the more layers they had the richer they were. Undergarments were considered very important, thus it happened that the quality and material of the underwear was better than that of the visible outer layers.

== Types ==
There were several types of sokgot: underskirts were generally called sokchima (속치마), while underpants were referred to as sokbaji (속바지). Under a jeogori, sokjeoksam (속적삼) and sokjeogori (속저고리) were worn.

A clothing item similar in function to today's panties was called dari sokgot (다리속곳), which was a wide band of cloth pulled through in between the legs and tied with ribbons at the waist, forming a shape similar to the Japanese fundoshi. Above this came the lowest layer of underskirts, called soksokgot (속속곳). One of these layers was a mujigi chima (무지기치마), which itself was sewn of several layers at knee-length, its function was to give shape and volume to the chima, raising it. Above this a daesyum chima (대슘치마) was added. Noble women also wore a noreunbaji (너른바지), a kind of additional underpants.

Male undergarments were significantly simpler, under the pants a pair of sokgoui (속고의), underpants were worn, while jeoksam (적삼) came under the jeogori in winter, and was worn on its own in summer.
