= Jewelers in Ming China =

The Ming Dynasty (1368-1644) was a flourishing era of luxury jewelry. The production was accomplished by specialized artisans who worked in both inner-city workshops and high imperial offices. Many producers were already born into artistically gifted families, as inherited from the Yuan dynasty and then formalized under the Ming. These workshops were a common connection to prestige jewelry for the imperial court, often providing decorative pieces for the imperial family and high-ranking officials. Certain workshops, including the Yuyuan Workshop (御用监) in Beijing, China, produced jewelry for Emperors Yongle and Hongwu. This notable workshop documented the many commissions of the imperial court, including a phoenix coronet (fengguan xiapei), which is often used for weddings.

== Social role ==
With their delicate specialty, jewelers occupied a very important and particular role in society. While not especially part of the upper class, their skills were highly valued. Their dexterity was often used for court ritual, luxury objects, and ceremonial dresses. Organizations like the Imperial Jewelry Service controlled production, assigned artisans to projects, and sustained quality standards. These highly productive workshops also existed in cities, providing the public service from artisans and helping to disburse goods outside the palace. To convey their high societal standards, records from the Hongwu reign showed that artisans in this role were required to deliver annual quotas, such as specific numbers of gold hairpins or jade belt plaques that were produced. Larger inner-city markets in Suzhou and Nanjing offered more affordable versions of these goods for the common people. The substituted materials would consist of coral-lined earrings and silver hairpins. These objects were frequently used for women in weddings or festivals.

== Materials ==
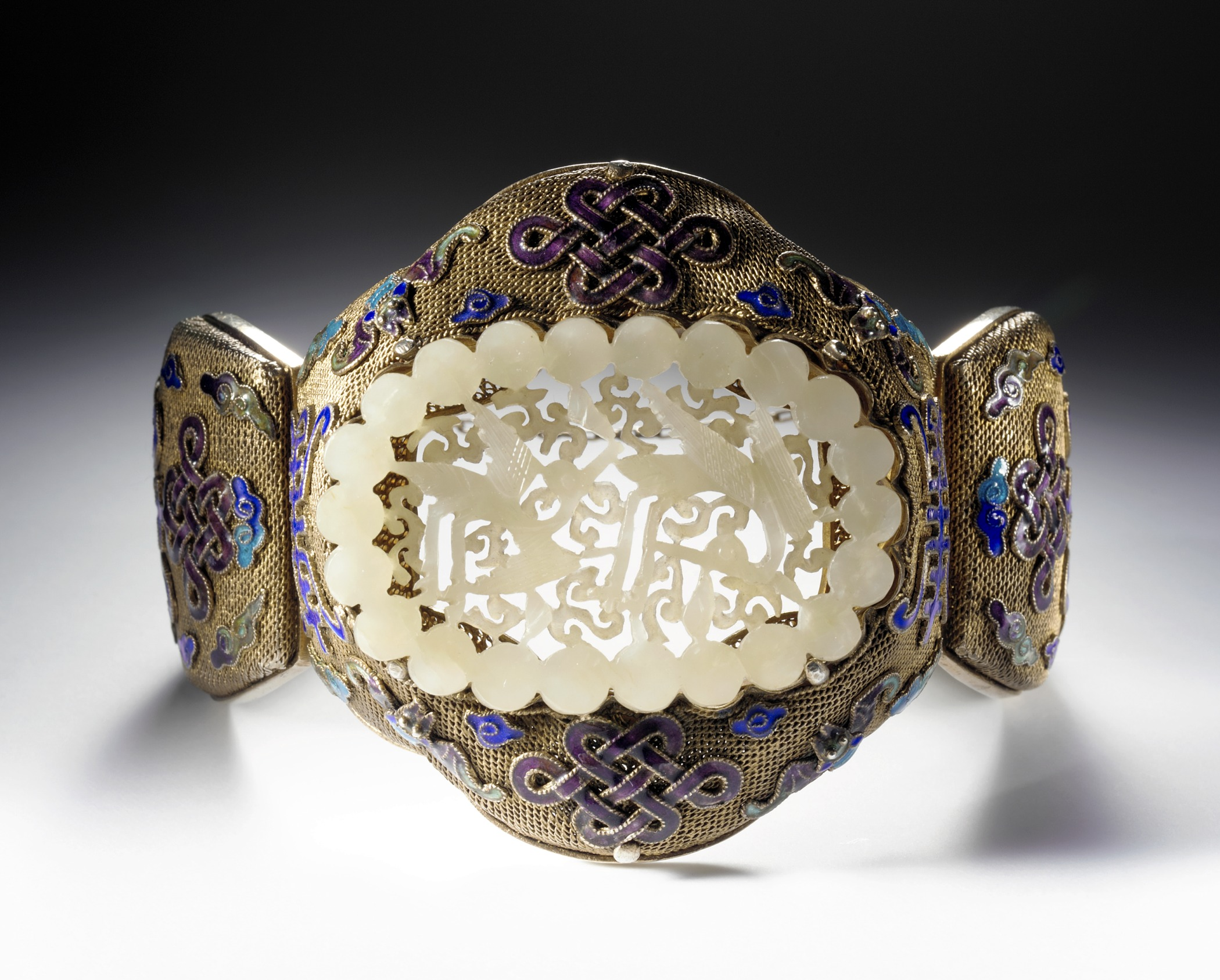
Late Ming dynasty Plaque

For their luxury production, Ming jewelers frequently worked with metals and gems like gold, silver, jade, and pearls. A main symbolism of purity and class was jade, particularly with its subgenre, nephrite. Many gemstones were imported, such as sapphires, rubies, and turquoise from Southeast Asia and other trade routes. For legal access to these gems, court eunuchs often controlled regulation of mines and imported materials. A main source of nephrite jade was displayed in modern Xinjiang; on discovery, many of these surviving Ming plaques still portrayed their original creamy white quality. Another decorative element was the use of pearls. Often collected from the South China Sea to use to enrich empresses' crowns. A mutual ornament was turquoise, often imported from Tibet; these impressive blue-green minerals were discovered from the burial site of Emperor Wanli (Dingling tomb) accessorized with turquoise-inlaid gold earrings.

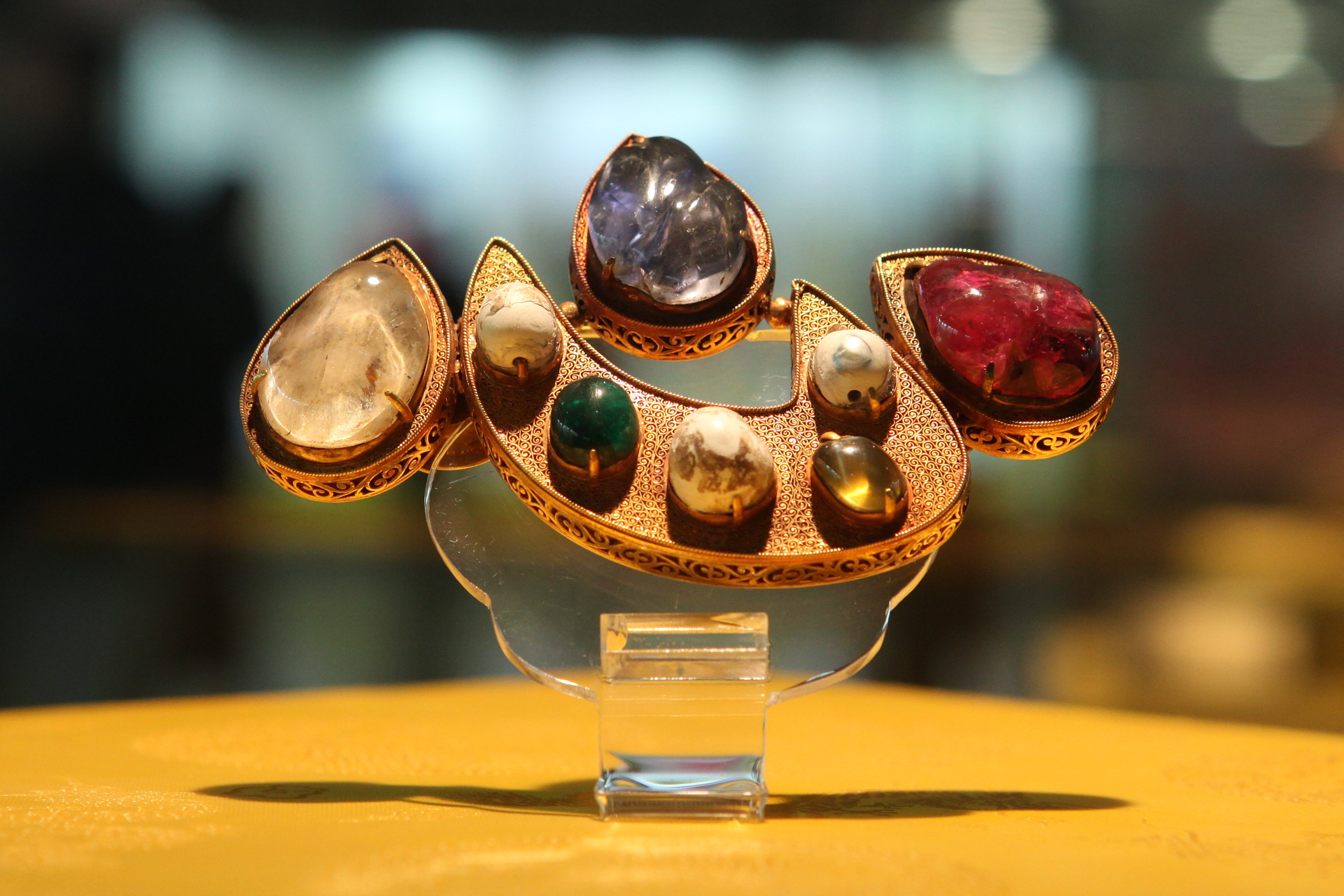
Chinese Xin-Shaped Jewelry from Ming Dynasty Tombs

== Techniques ==
To achieve the various designs of the civilized artistic techniques, Ming artists created several different ways of illustrating their skills. Documents and evidence from tomb findings showed that jewelers often specialized in one technique for the entirety of their careers.

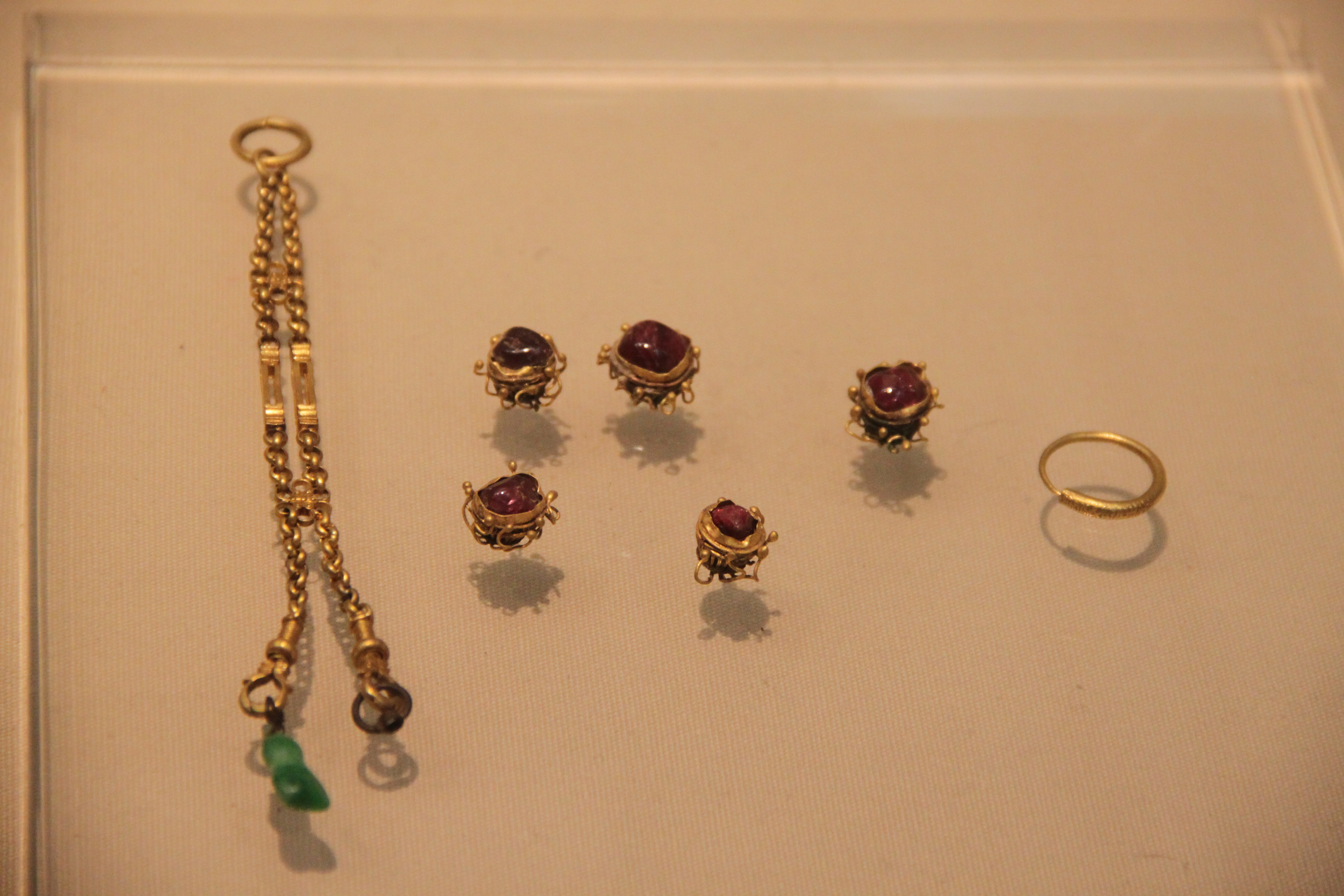
Gold Ming Jewelry Accessories

Jade Carving: Credited for its symbolic design, artists often produced plaques, pendants, and other accessories out of the unique gemstone. Found in the Dingling Mausoleum, the "dragon-and-cloud" jade plaque is carved out using abrasion. Items found in the Palace Museum, such as jade belt hooks, are among the surviving elements of the dynasty's high-ranking officials' court history.

Filigree: Complex luxury patterns woven from fine gold or silver, often used for hairpins or headdresses. A famous example of filigree is held in the Palace Museum; it consists of a gold filigree and kingfisher feather hairpin, wrapped from gold wires arranged in floral patterns. The Ming court commissioned various filigree items, like incense burners that combine filigree with cloisonné.

Gem embedding: Certain metals are embedded into silver or gold frameworks to create appealing designs. Detailed artisans carefully laid gemstones like rubies, sapphires, and pearls to be the ultimate final decorative piece for these items. Some examples of this practice include silver hairpins decorated with pearls and gold belt plaques with jade or turquoise.

Headwear ornamentation: To indicate imperial or high-ranking roles in court ceremony, artisans designed headdresses. Combining metalwork, pearls, and gemstones. The most well-known example of this exquisite headwear is Empress Xiaoduanxian's phoenix crown displayed in the Palace Museum. This highly complex portrayal of intricate craftsmanship is garnished with over 100 rubies, 500 pearls, and gold filigree birds. During the Qing Dynasty, high-ranking officials in power wore hat finials (dǐng) made of jade and coral to present their social ranking to society.

== Social symbolism and court use ==
Not merely accessories, this jewelry communicated social rank and marital status. Decorative pieces like earrings, hairpins, and pendants would indicate to society their position within the court hierarchy. Whereas male officials would wear accessories such as jade pendants or belt plaques for the dress code. To extend the inherent overlapping of jewelry production and luxury craftsmanship, objects like boxes, trays, and ritual materials were made to reflect these values. Some of the accessories were exclusively reserved for empresses and first-rank consorts; specifically, phoenix crowns held great importance. While second-ranking women often used simpler kingfisher-feather headwear. As for their male counterparts, officials wore jade belt plaques illustrated with certain animalistic symbols. Civil officials would have dragons, whereas military officials wore lions. As a lot of symbolic objects are used ceremonially, ritual boxes were often made as sacrifices to ancestors. Plated in gold and pearls, this production of jewelry reinforced its important role in society.

== Museum Archaeology ==
These luxurious objects, such as filigree hairpins and jade and gold ornaments, survived through the tombs of Ming elites. These artifacts demonstrate the technical handcrafted skill of Ming jewelers and provide us with the workshop styles we know today. Excavations from Ming tombs in the Shanxi province were shown to have jade belt plaques engraved with phoenixes and coiled dragons, silver pendants with turquoise, and gold filigree hairpins decorated with numerous pearls. Some hairpins discovered in ancient tombs consisted of hairpins measuring over 15 centimeters long with different wire patterns to attach to kingfisher feathers. The British Museum holds many ancient Chinese pieces that show the diverse evolution of China. They hold late Ming dynasty lotus hairpins, while the Metropolitan Museum of Art displays rectangular jade plaques carved with five-clawed dragon designs.

== Yuan Continuity ==
After the Ming dynasty ended, the new Yuan continued many jewelry techniques and materials, especially in gemstone work and filigree. As the specialty developed through the dynasty, Ming artisans expanded and polished these methods, making jewelry recognizable for the Ming era's distinctive artistry. As Yuan had their own jewelry trends, historical documents showed that Ming jewelers preserved a lot of these traditions. The Ming dynasty continued Yuan customs through their belt plaques, utilizing the original rectangular form and dragon engravings, but altered them to be smaller to fit into court officials' dress code. They also used Yuan filigree hairpin techniques but added tighter wire patterns. These explorations of jewelry through dynasties reflect the inherited desire to improve the intricate craft.
