= Tian-tsui =

Traditional Chinese feather art

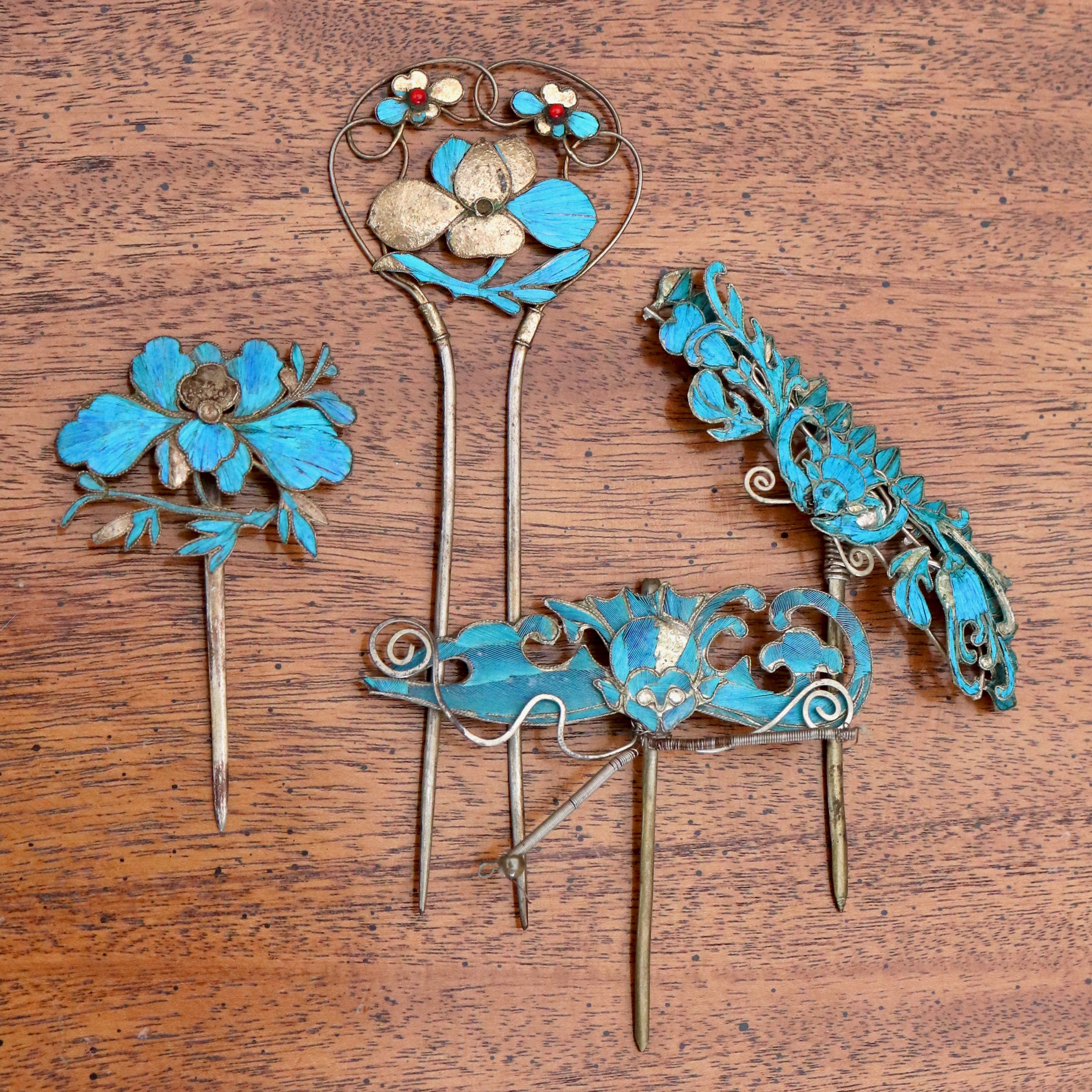
Antique Tian-tsui (Kingfisher feather) hair pins. 19th century.

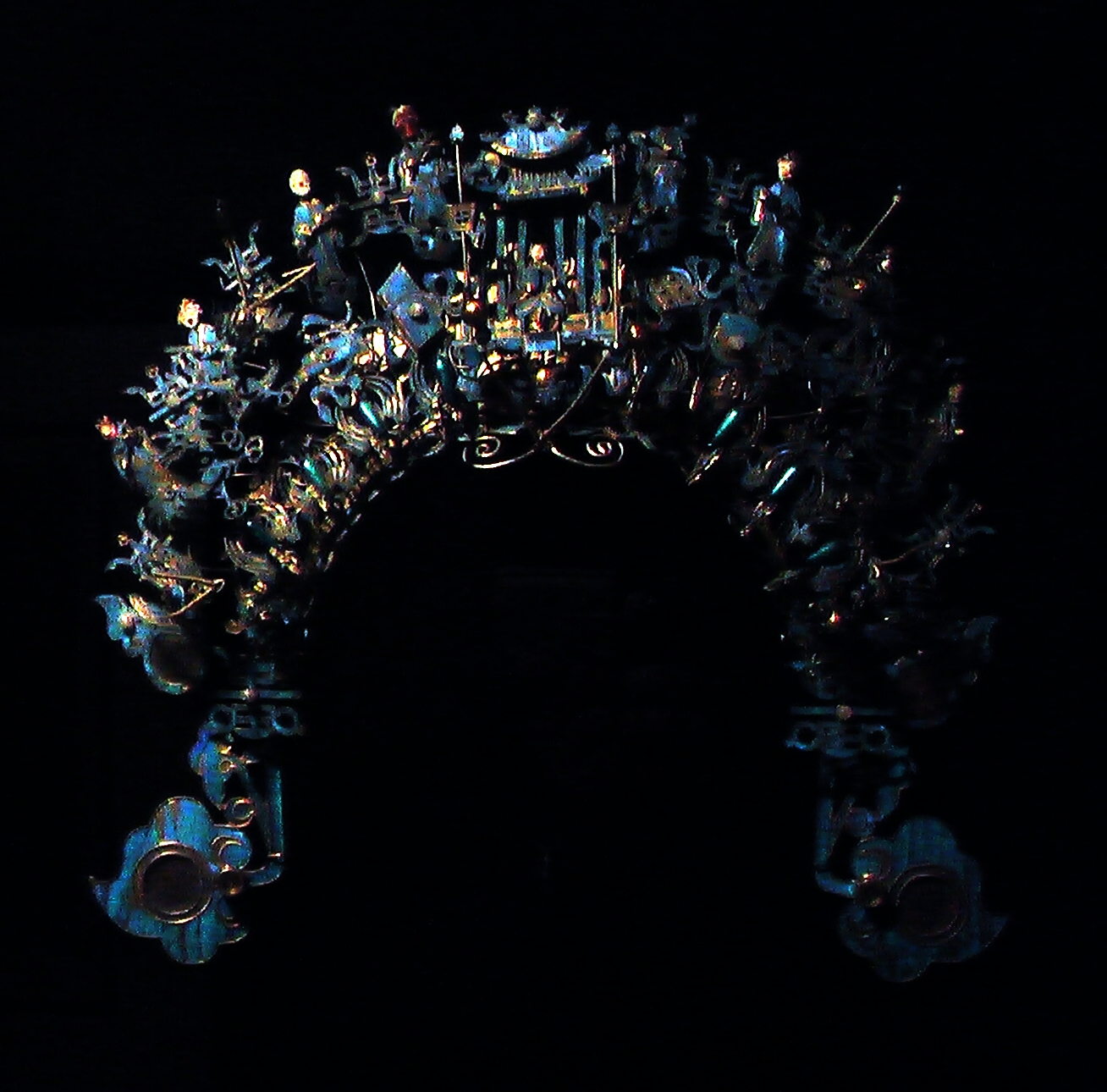
'Chinese Qing kingfisher feather tiara, circa 1851-1861AD

Tian-tsui (Chinese traditional: 點翠, Chinese simplified: 点翠, pinyin: diǎncuì, "dotting with kingfishers") is a style of Chinese art featuring kingfisher feathers. For 2,000 years, the Chinese have been using the iridescent blue feathers of kingfisher birds as an inlay for fine art objects and adornment, from hairpins, headdresses, and fans to panels and screens. While Western art collectors have focused on other areas of Chinese art including porcelain, lacquer ware, sculpture, cloisonné, silk and paintings, kingfisher art is relatively unknown outside of China.

Kingfisher feathers are painstakingly cut and glued onto gilt silver. The effect is like cloisonné, but no enamel was able to rival the electric blue color. Blue is the traditional favorite color in China.

As with most iridescent, electrifying colors in animals such as morpho butterfly wings, the intense color in bird feathers comes not from pigments in the feather itself, but from the way light is bent and reflected back out, much like a prism breaks white light into its spectrum of rainbow colors. These microscopic structures in feathers are called photonic crystals.

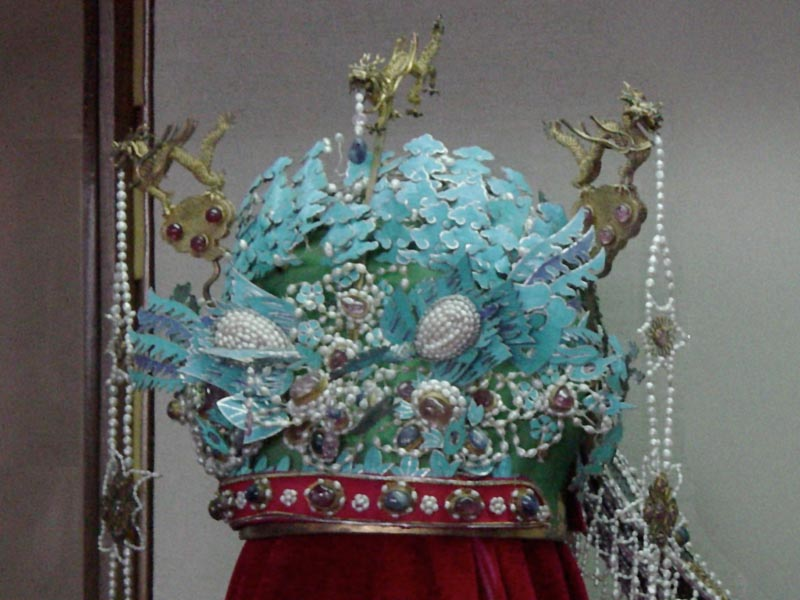
Imperial Queen's Headdress with Tian-tsui, Ming Dynasty.

The most expensive, commissioned pieces used a species of kingfisher from Cambodia. So great was the export to sate Chinese demand, the trade of feathers may have been a major contributor to the wealth of the Khmer Empire, and used to help fund the construction of the magnificent temples near Siem Reap, Cambodia including Angkor Wat. The finest pieces of kingfisher art were reserved for royalty or high-ranking Chinese government official (called a "mandarin"). The usage of kingfisher feathers resulted in the mass slaughter of many kingfisher species.

With dwindling numbers of Kingfishers, the last studio that specializes in Tian-tsui closed in 1933. Tian-tsui as a high art form came to an end after the Chinese Communist Revolution as the new communist government classifies Kingfishers as a Class 2 Protected Animal, preventing the harvest of the feathers required for the craft.

== See also ==
- Chinese art
- Phoenix crown
- Chinese hairpin
