= Fengguan =

Chinese historical hat

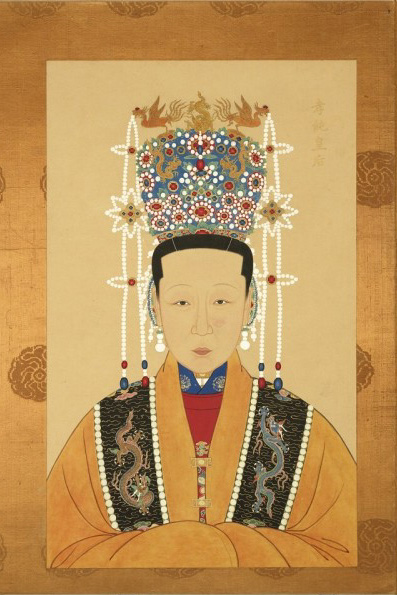
- Fengguan worn by Empress Dowager Xiaochun of the Ming dynasty.

Chinese name
- Traditional Chinese: 鳳冠
- Simplified Chinese: 凤冠
Transcriptions
Standard Mandarin
- Hanyu Pinyin: Fèngguān

English name
- English: Phoenix coronet/ phoenix hat

Fengguan (Chinese: 鳳冠; pinyin: fèngguān), also known as phoenix coronet or phoenix hat, is a type of guan (a type of Chinese traditional headgear) for women in Hanfu. It was worn mainly by noblewomen for ceremonies or official occasions. It is also traditional headgear for brides and could be worn in set of Traditional Chinese wedding dress attire, such as the fengguan xiapei.

== Terminology ==
Fengguan literally means "phoenix crown", a name that originates from its adornments: phoenixes made of inlaid kingfisher feathers, as well as gold dragons, beaded pheasants, pearls, and other gemstones. One of the earliest phoenix crowns that has been excavated belonged to Empress Xiao of the Sui dynasty. The type became most popular during the Ming dynasty, with many changes made over time.

== History ==
Late-Tang style phoenix crowns

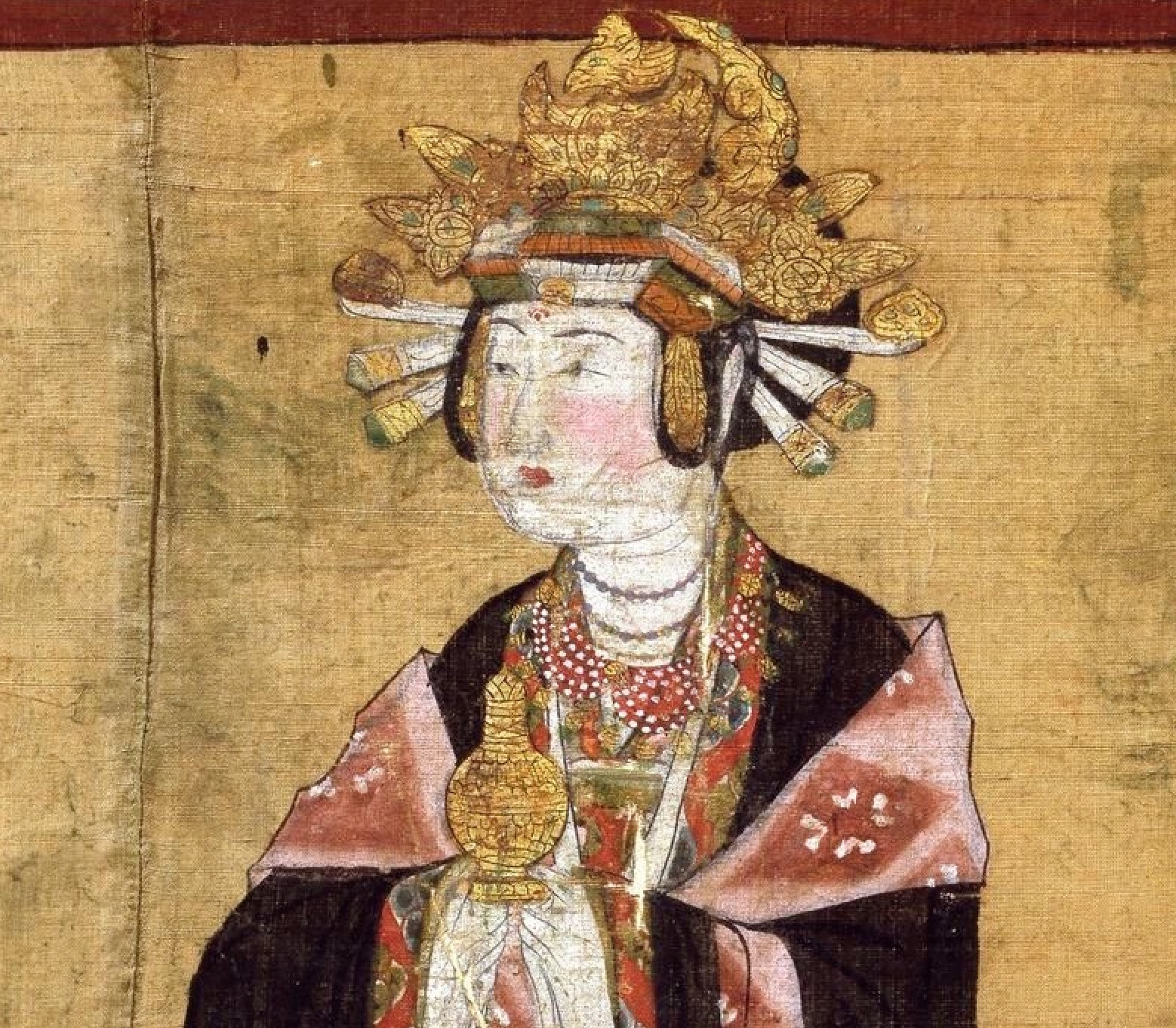
Noblewoman wearing a gold phoenix crown

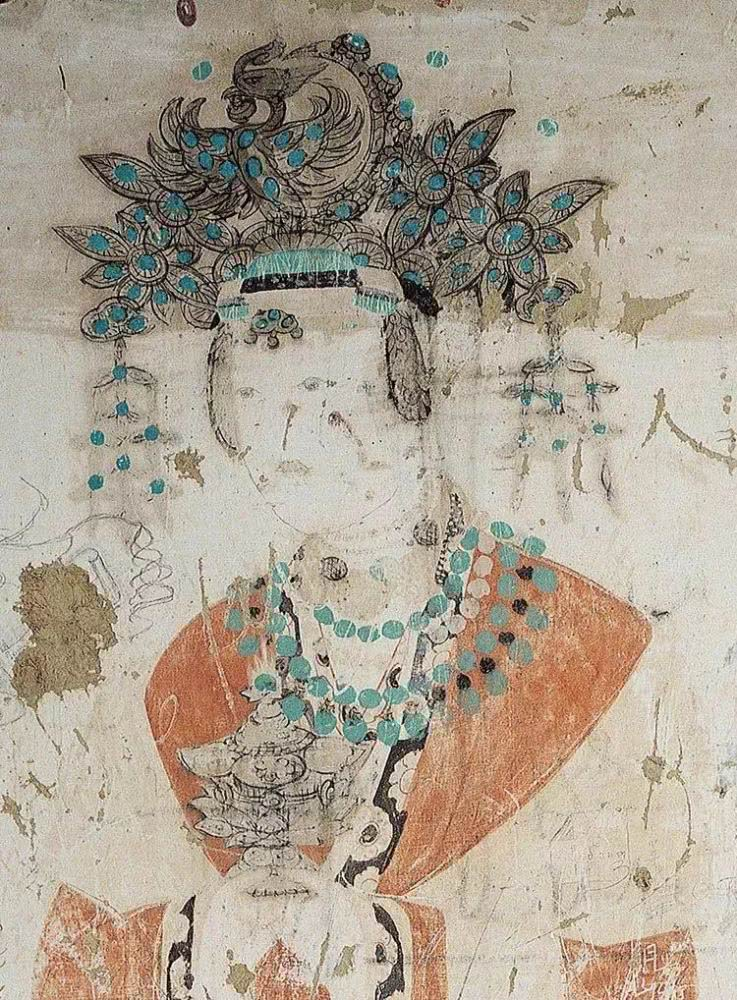
Lady Liang-kuo wearing a silver phoenix crown

Fengguan evolved from fèngchāi (鳳釵; 'phoenix hairpin'), the Chinese hairpin worn by empresses and emperor's concubines. The wearing of fengchai was issued by Emperor Qin Shihuang (259BC–210BC). It was in Eastern Jin (317–420 AD) that the word fengguan first came up; however, it was referring to the hairpin which was imitating the comb of Chinese phoenix.

The earliest fengguan discovered was the crown of Empress Xiao of the Sui dynasty, unearthed from the Emperor Yang of Sui's tomb in 2013. The crown was made under the order of Emperor Taizong of Tang after the empress's death. The artifact was protect-repaired and studied in Shaanxi Provincial Cultural Heritage Administration; later, a replica was made based on the studies.

== Construction and design ==
Kingfisher feathers were extremely rare during the Ming dynasty and were potentially sourced from Cambodia. The numbers of phoenixes, dragons and precious gems on each crown is different. For example, the phoenix crown of Ming Empress Xiaoduanxian has 6 dragons, 3 phoenixes, 5,449 pearls, 71 rubies, and 57 sapphires. Other phoenix crowns of empresses excavated from the Ming tombs have 9 phoenixes, between 12 and 9 dragons, more than 3,500 pearls, and more than 150 gemstones. The pearls, gemstones and kingfisher feathers were made into ornamental flowers, leaves, clouds, and temple ornaments (兩博鬢; liǎngbóbìn; the 'wings' at the sides and back of the crown). The weight of the entire crown can range from 2–3 kilograms (4.4–6.6 lb).

== Styles ==
There are different varieties of fengguan. The number of dragons, phoenixes, and pheasants, in addition to the presence of certain ornaments was dictated by rank.

=== Empresses ===
9-dragons, 4-phoenixes crown (九龍四鳳冠)

Shierlongjiu fengguan (十二龍九鳳冠) is the 12-dragons, 9-phoenixes crown.

Jiulongjiu fengguan (九龍九鳳冠) is the 9-dragons, 9-phoenixes crown.

Jiulongsi fengguan (九龍四鳳冠) is the 9-dragons, 4-phoenixes crown.

Liulongsan fengguan (六龍三鳳冠) is the 6-dragons, 3-phoenixes crown.

Sanlonger fengguan (三龍二鳳冠) is the 3-dragons, 2-phoenixes crown.

Only the crowns of empresses and crown princesses (wife of crown prince) could have temple ornaments adorned. The empress's crown had 6 blades of temple ornaments (3 on each side).

=== Imperial concubines and princesses ===
Jiudiguan (九翟冠; 'nine-pheasants crown'), qidiguan (七翟冠; 'seven-pheasants crown') and wudiguan (五翟冠; 'five-pheasants crown'), adorned with beaded pheasants and gold phoenixes, are worn by royal concubines and princesses (includes wives of princes), with the number of pheasants representing the wearer's royal rank. The crown princess can only have 4 blades of temple ornaments (2 on each side)

=== Noblewomen ===
All other noblewomen/wives and daughters of officials wear the "pearl-and-emerald crown" (珍珠翡翠冠; zhēnzhūfěicuìguān), where the crown is just adorned with pearls and gemstones (in various ornamental shapes). Phoenix crowns worn with diyi have no strings of pearls by the sides of the head. Noblewomen cannot have temple ornaments on their headdresses.

== Wedding ==
Coloured hats worn by commoner women on their wedding ceremony during the Ming and Qing dynasty was also called fengguan. The practice is believed to have started during Southern Song when the Emperor rewarded a girl for saving his life. Women wearing the fengguan as part of their set of wedding clothing has been a long tradition in the area of Zhejiang. The fengguan was a symbol of good fortune. However, women who were remarrying for a second time and who were to be become a man's concubine were not allowed to wear fengguan.

== Gallery ==
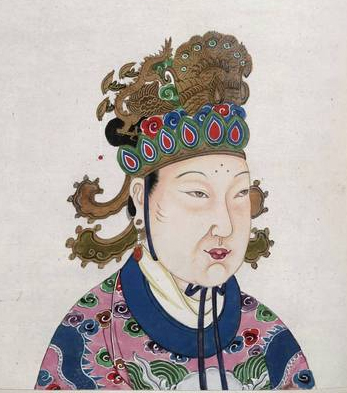
Tang dynasty phoenix crown worn by Empress regnant Wu Zetian.

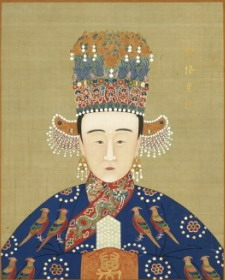
Ming dynasty phoenix crown with diyi worn by Empress Xiaoke.

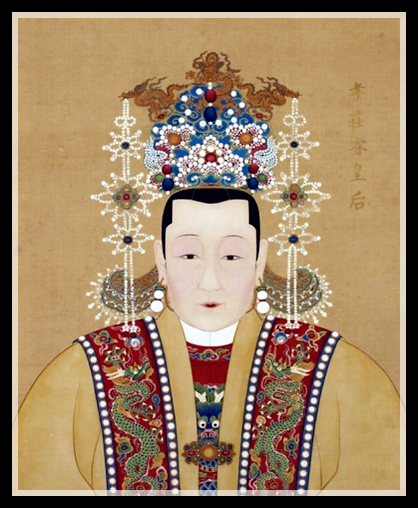
Ming dynasty phoenix crown with strings of pearls worn by Empress Xiaozhuangrui.

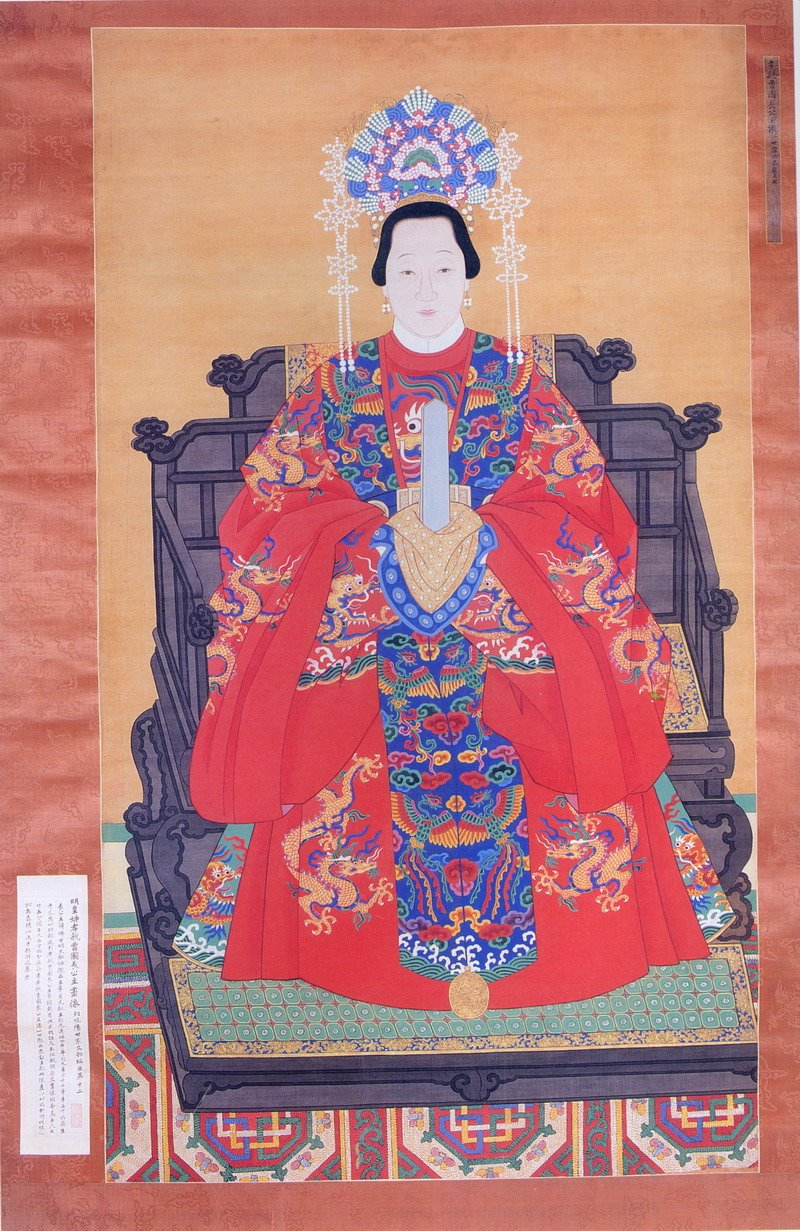
Ming dynasty noblewoman wearing a crown with 9 pheasants and traditional Ming dress, known as fengguan xiapei.

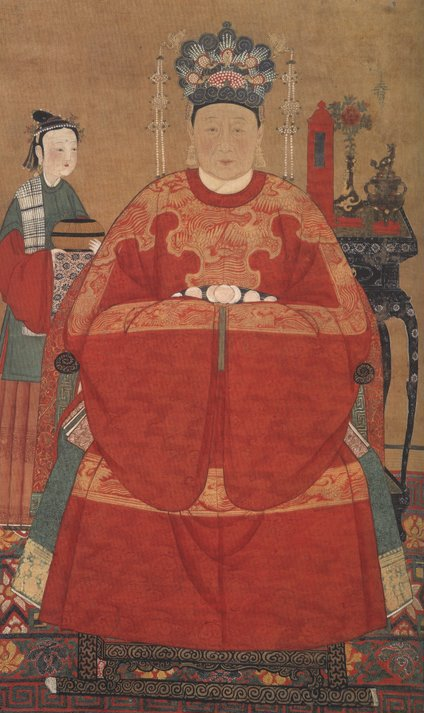
Ming dynasty noblewoman wearing a crown with 5 pheasants and traditional Ming dress.

View of the reverse of a Ming dynasty empress' phoenix crown with 3 dragons and 3 phoenixes.

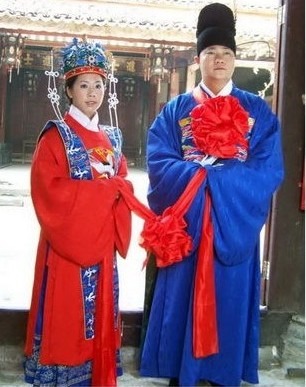
Bride wearing a phoenix crown for a wedding.

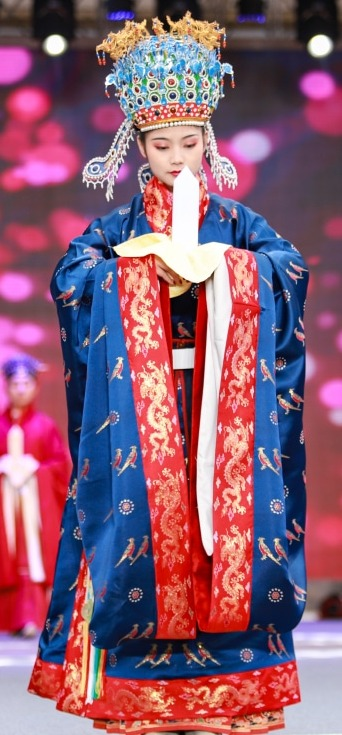
Diyi worn with phoenix crown.

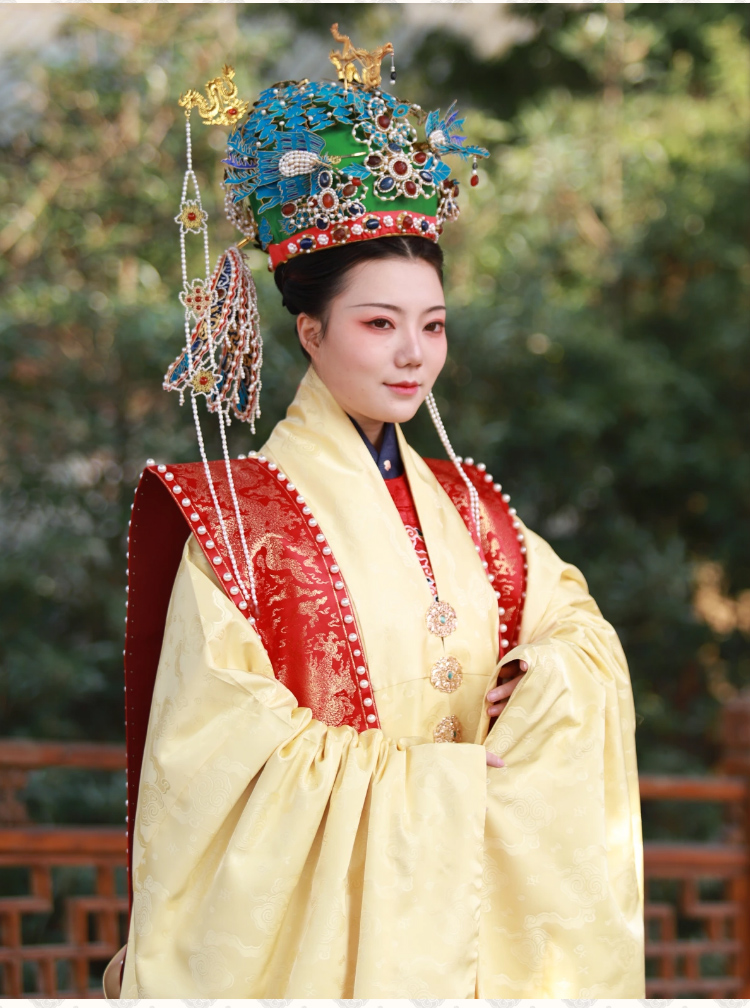
Dashan (大衫) worn with phoenix crown (side view).

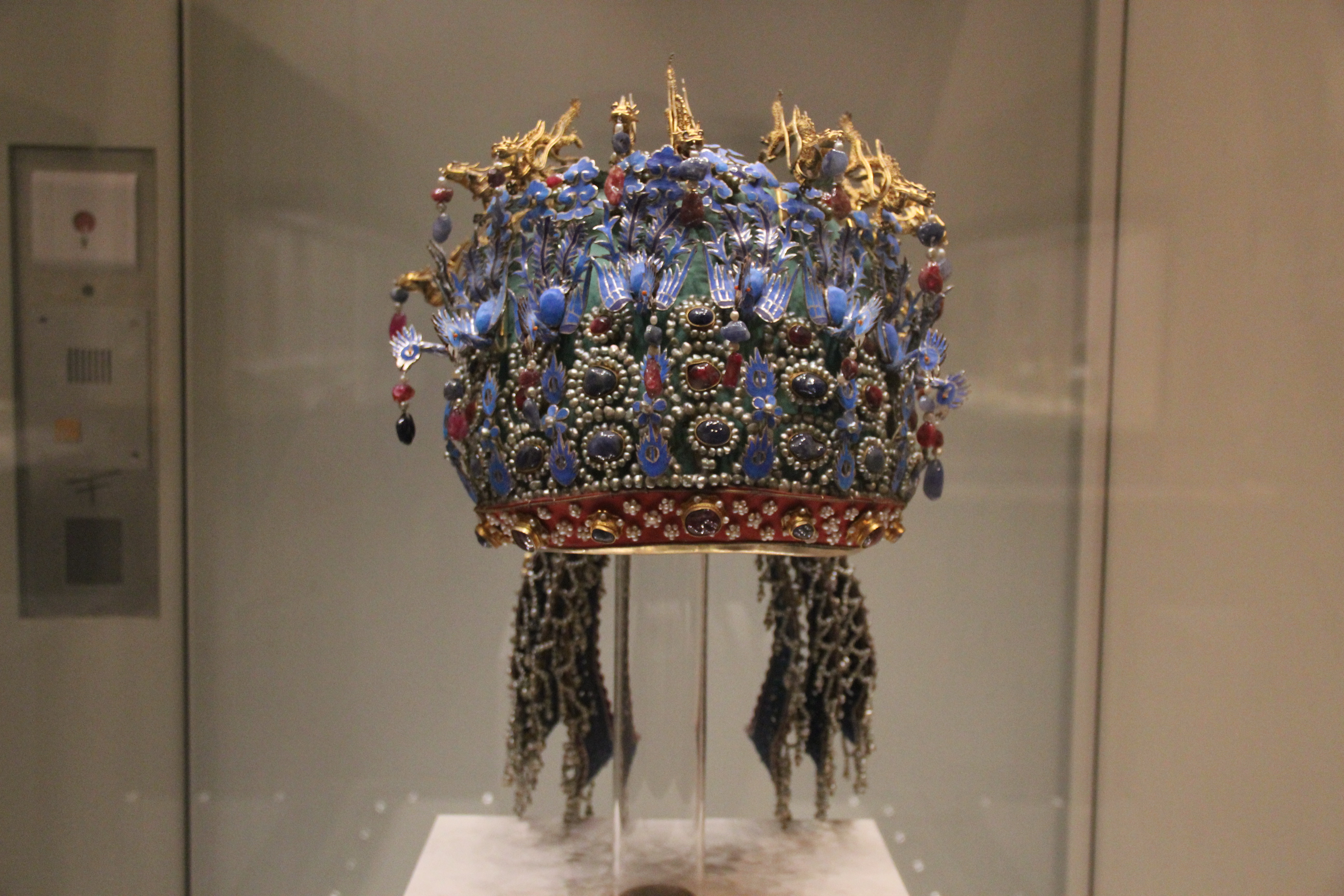
Ming dynasty phoenix crown with 9 dragons and 9 phoenixes.

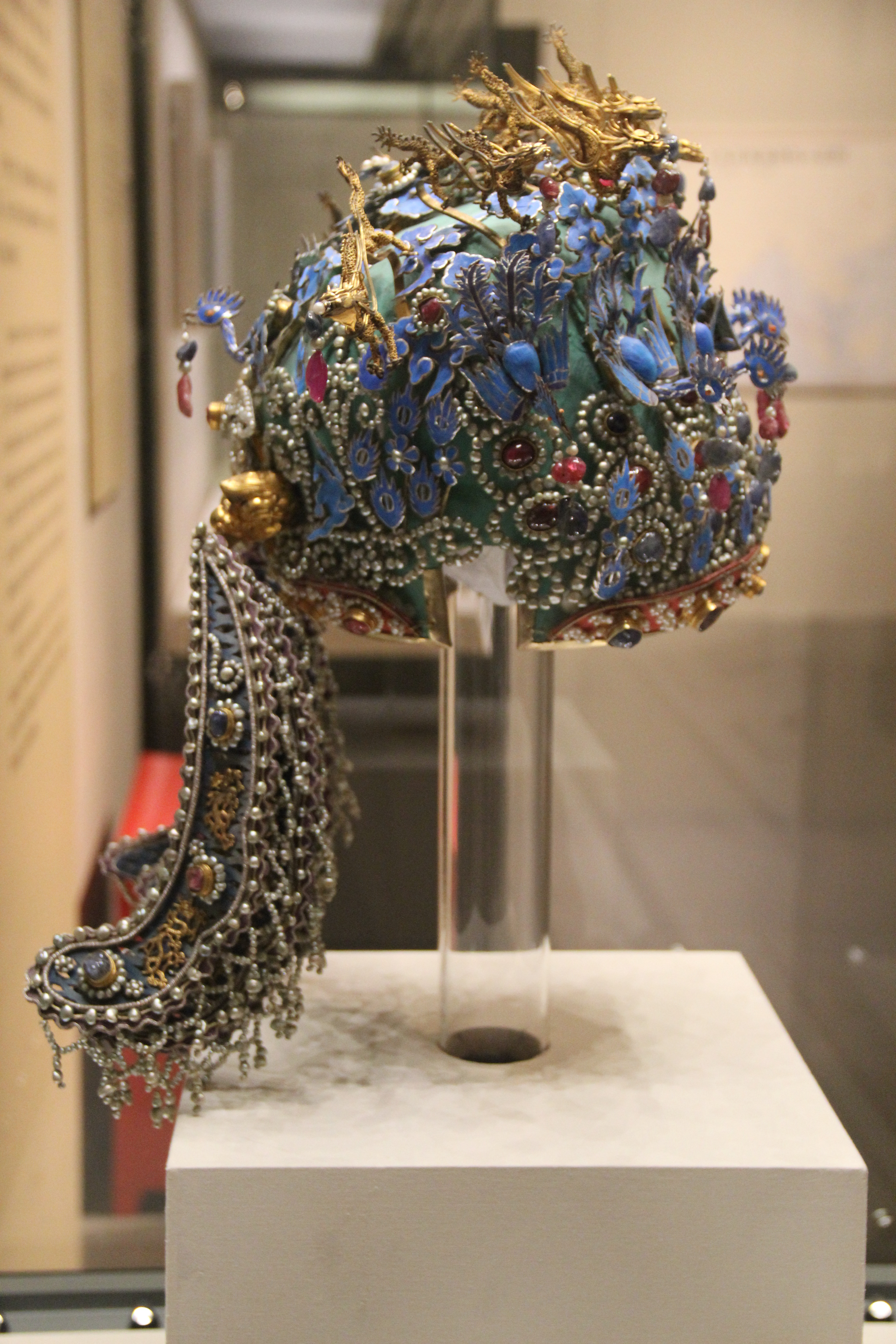
Ming dynasty phoenix crown with 9 dragons and 9 phoenixes. (side view)

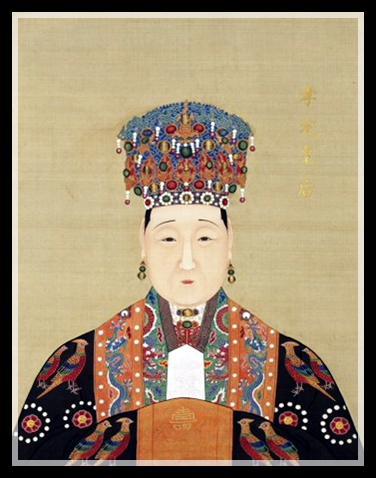
Empress Dowager Xiaoding of the Ming dynasty wearing a crown and traditional Ming costume.

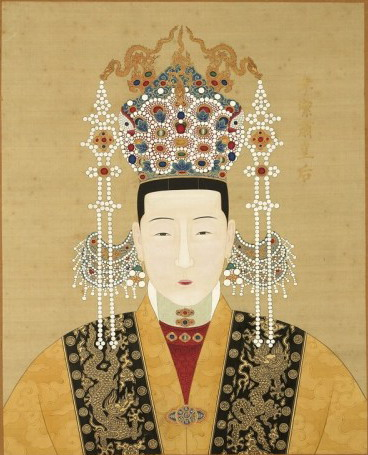
Empress Xiaojiesu of the Ming dynasty wearing a phoenix crown and traditional Ming costume.

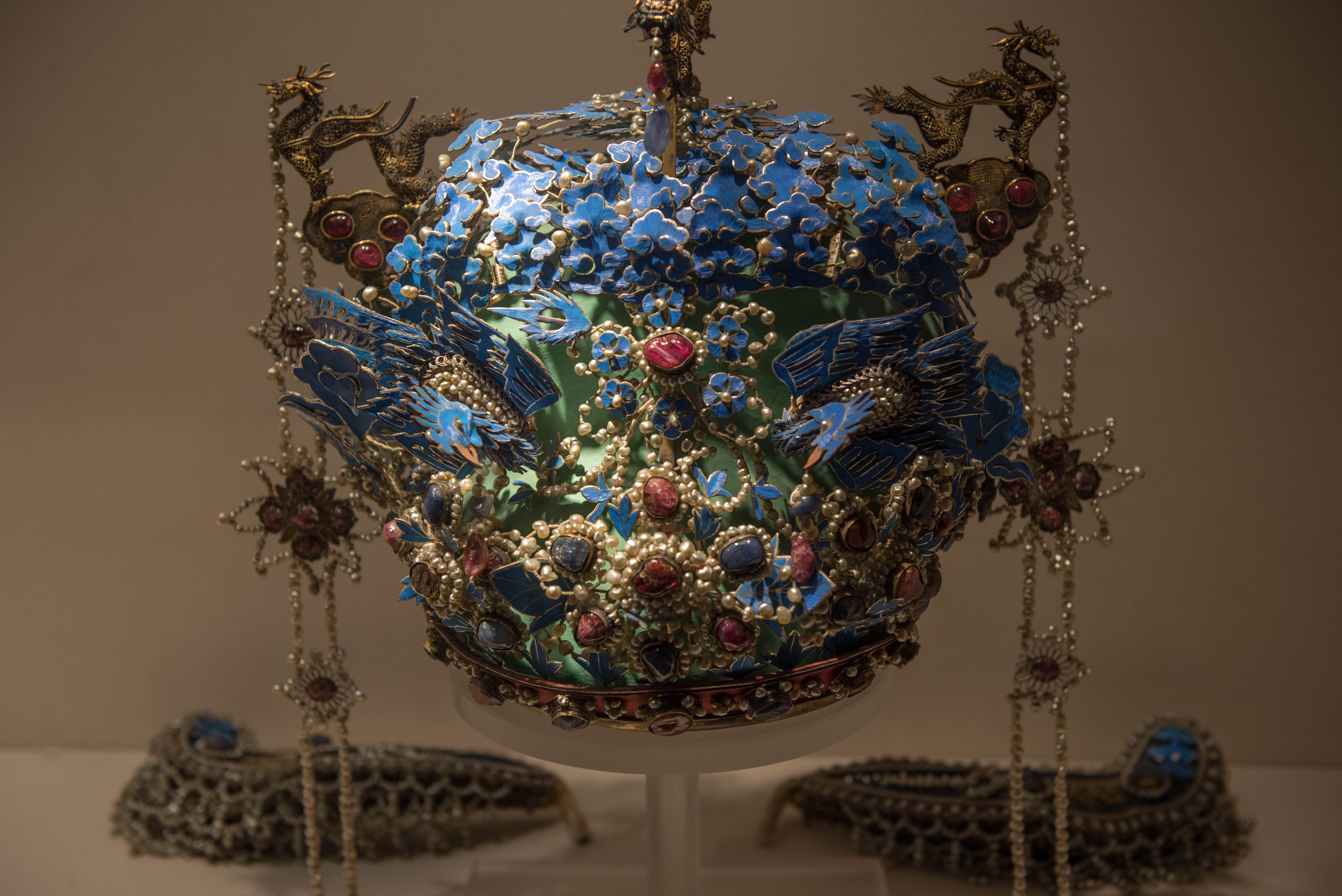
A Ming dynasty crown with three dragons and two phoenixes.

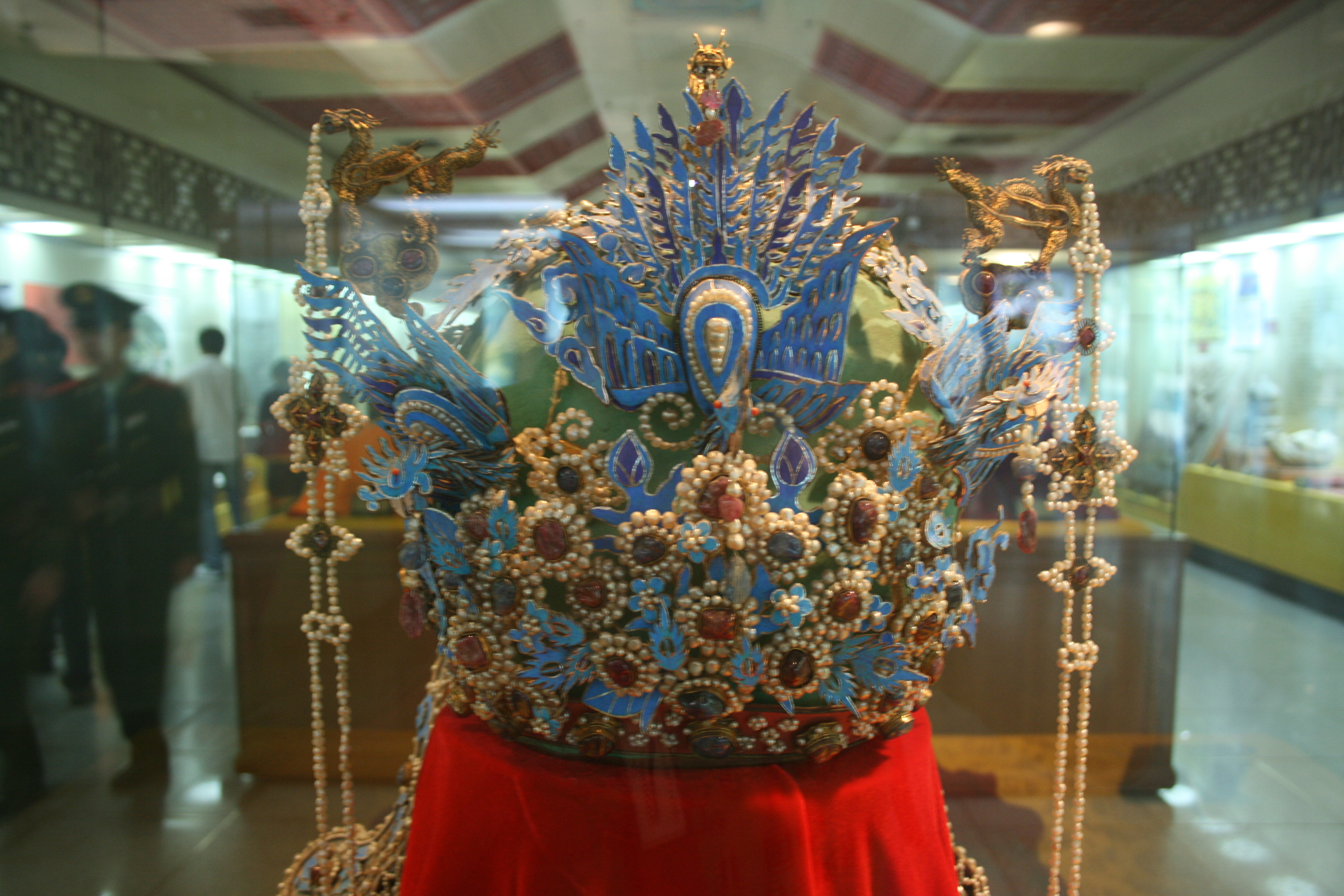
Ming dynasty phoenix crown with 6 dragons and 3 phoenixes belonging to Empress Xiaoduanxian.

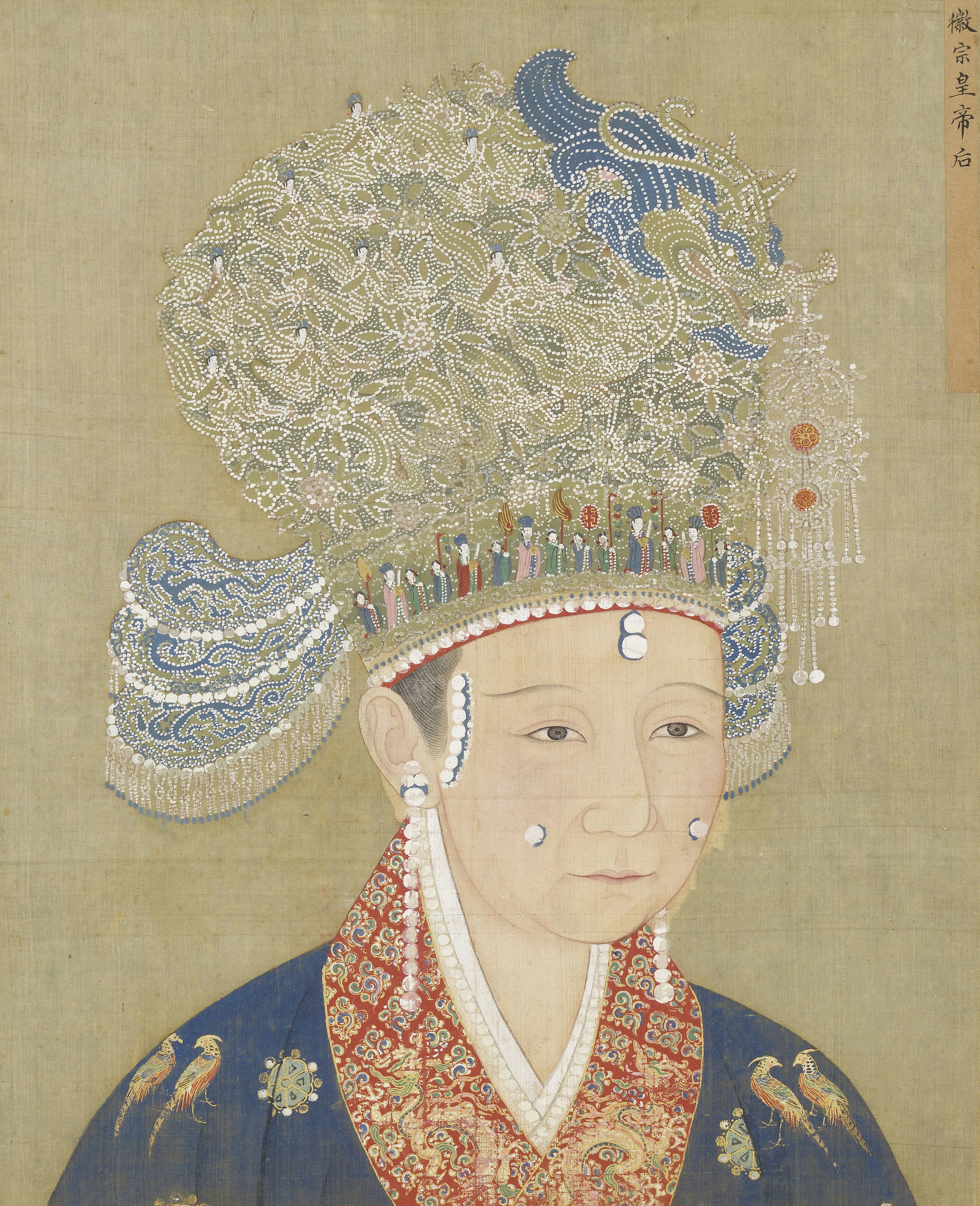
Fengguan of Empress Xiansu of the Song dynasty.

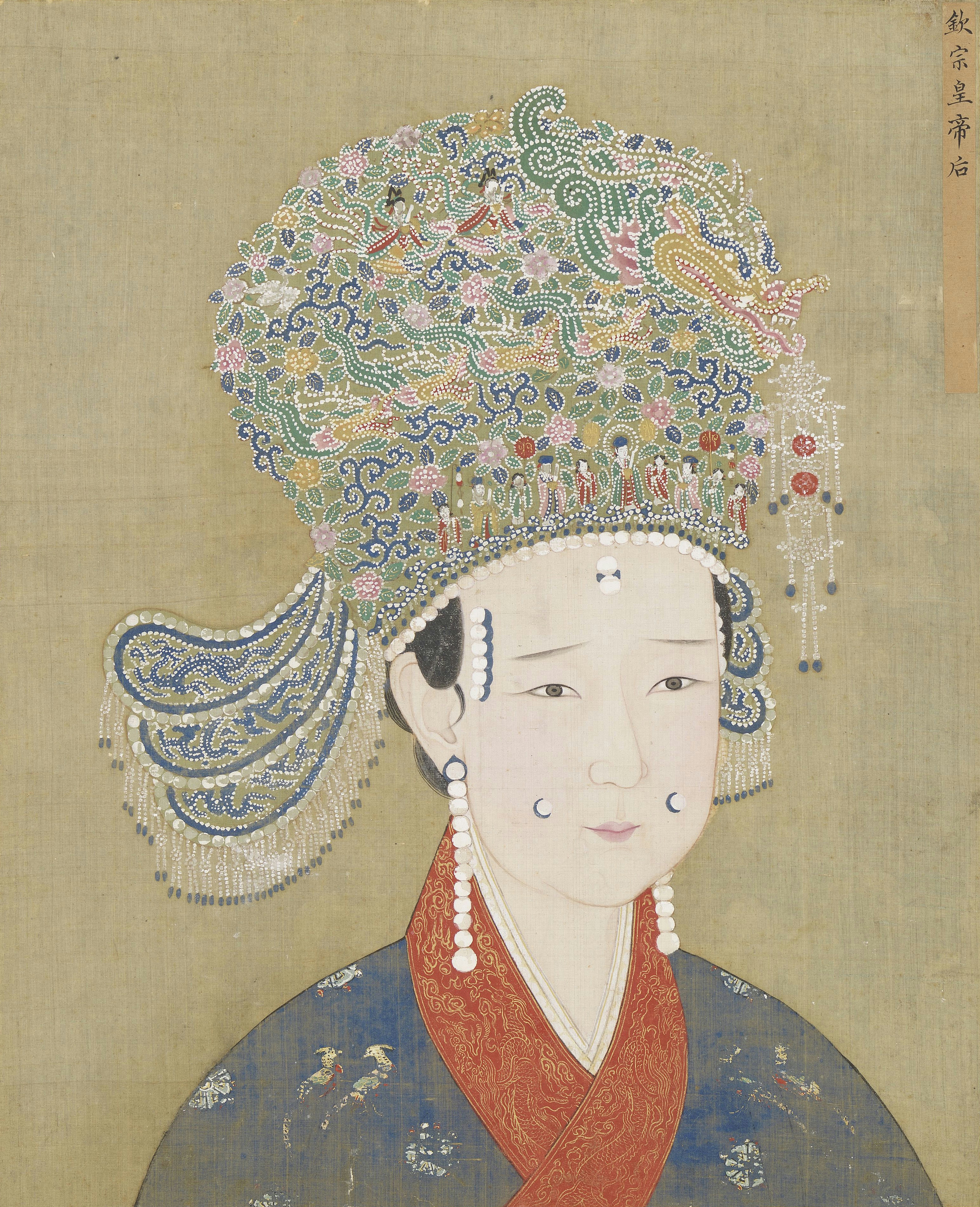
Fengguan of Empress Zhu of the Song dynasty.

== Related content ==
- Chinese hairpin
- Xiapei
- Fengguan xiapei

== See also ==
- Consort crown
- Tiara
- Hanfu
- Qungua
- Kokoshnik
