= Fengguan xiapei =

Traditional Chinese wedding garment

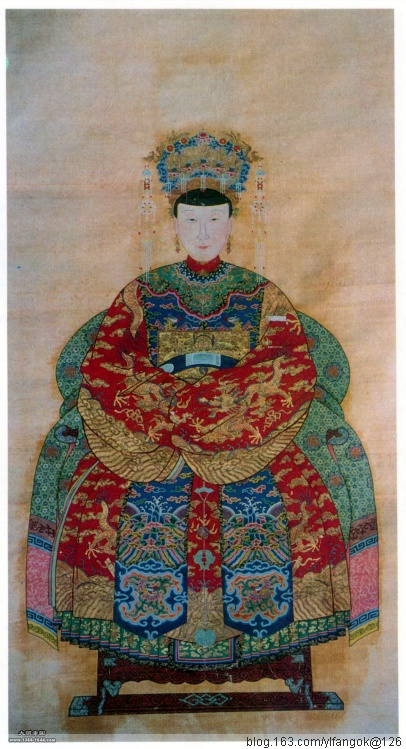
- Qing dynasty fengguan xiapei (凤冠霞帔), a yunjian is worn on top of the attire.
- Type: Traditional Chinese wedding dress aoqun
- Place of origin: China

Fengguan xiapei (Chinese: 凤冠霞帔) is a type of traditional Chinese wedding clothing categorized under Hanfu, which was worn by Han Chinese women in Ming and Qing dynasties. The fengguan xiapei attire was composed an upper and lower garment following the traditional Chinese yichang clothing system. It was typically composed of a red coloured mang ao (蟒袄; 'python jacket'), a type of a Chinese qun-skirt known as mǎngqún (蟒裙; 'Python skirt'), the xiapei (霞帔), and the fengguan. The fengguan xiapei was sometimes adorned with the yunjian. Following the wedding ceremony, married women were expected to wear the fengguan xiapei on formal occasions, however, Chinese trousers or leggings were worn beneath instead of the skirt.

== Construction and design ==
In the Qing dynasty, the fengguan xiapei was a set of attire which was composed of a red coloured ao, a type of Chinese upper garment, called mangao (蟒袄; 'python jacket') and a qun, lower skirt, called mangchu (lit. 'python skirt'). The mangao was a in the style of the Ming dynasty yuanlingshan which was typically decorated with Chinese dragons and was used to be worn by the Han Chinese women as a court robe in the Ming dynasty. The mangchu (蟒裙; 'Python skirt') was a qun, which could either be red or green in colour; it was typically embroidered with dragons and phoenixes on the front and back skirt panel. The set was also completed by two important accessories from which the set of attire gained its name: the xiapei (霞帔) and the phoenix coronet, known as fengguan. The appearance of the xiapei appearance and construction differed depending on the time period: in the Ming dynasty, the xiapei was similar to a long scarf or stole in appearance; however, it could either be found in the shape of a stole or a waistcoat in the Qing dynasty. Sometimes, the fengguan xiapei can be further decorated with Chinese cloud collar known as yunjian.

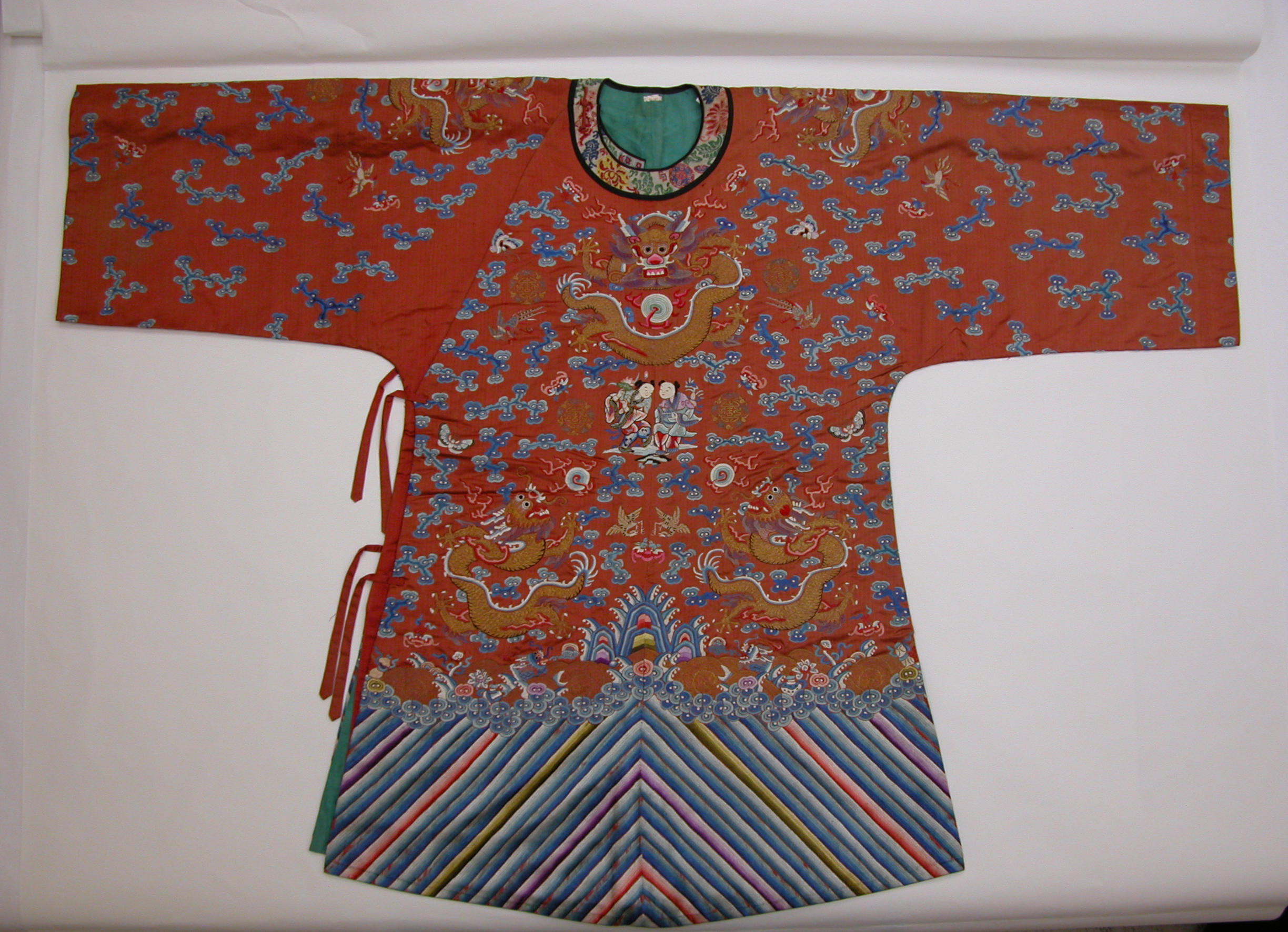
A mangao in the style of a yuanlingshan, Qing dynasty, 19th century.

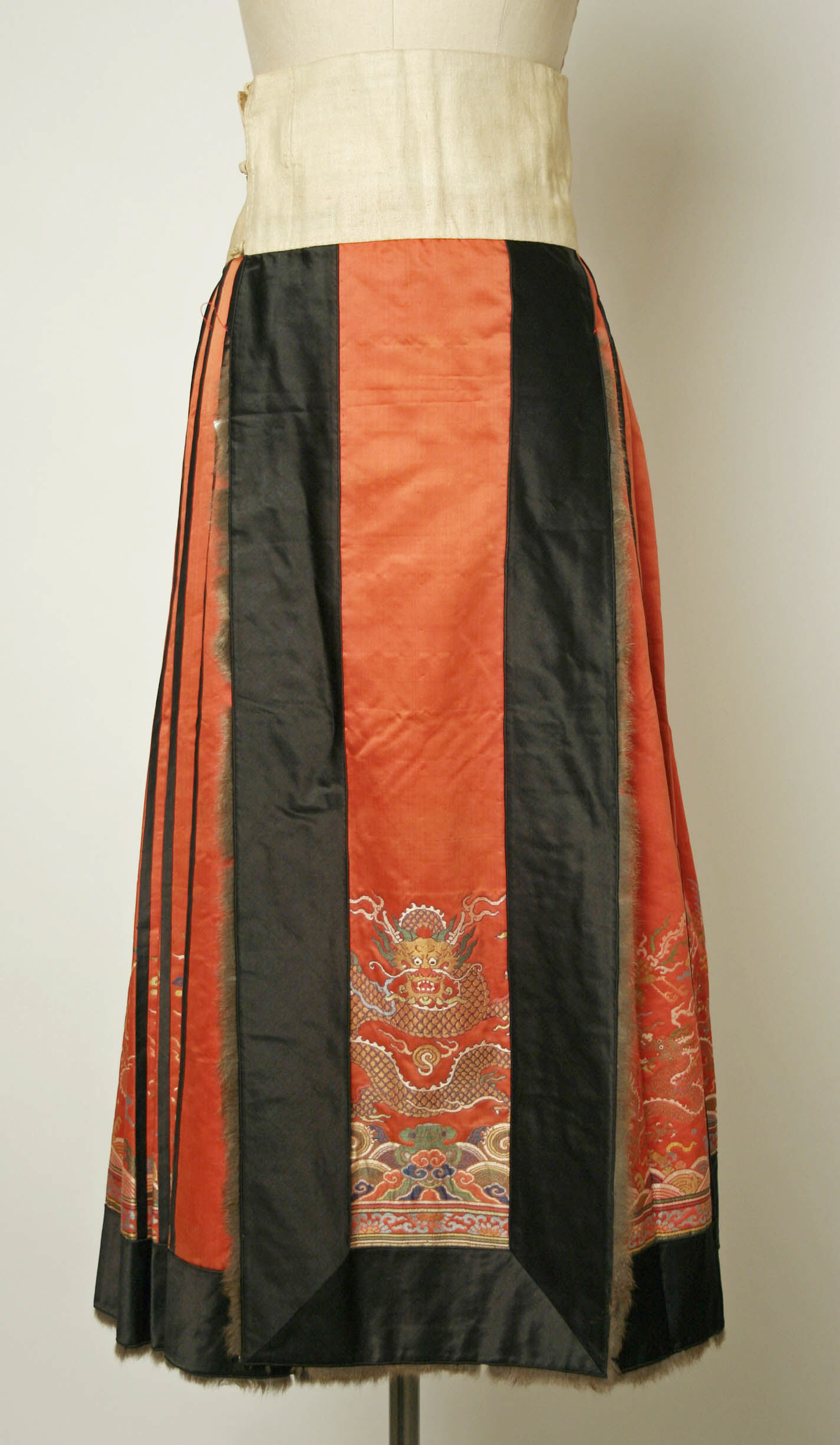
A red mangchu, Qing dynasty

== See also ==
- Traditional Chinese wedding dress
- Fengguan
- Xiapei
- Hanfu
- Ruqun
- Traditional Chinese marriage

== Gallery ==
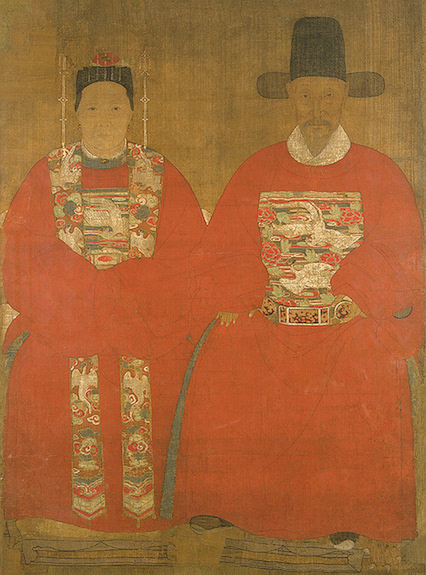
Ming dynasty fengguan xiapei.

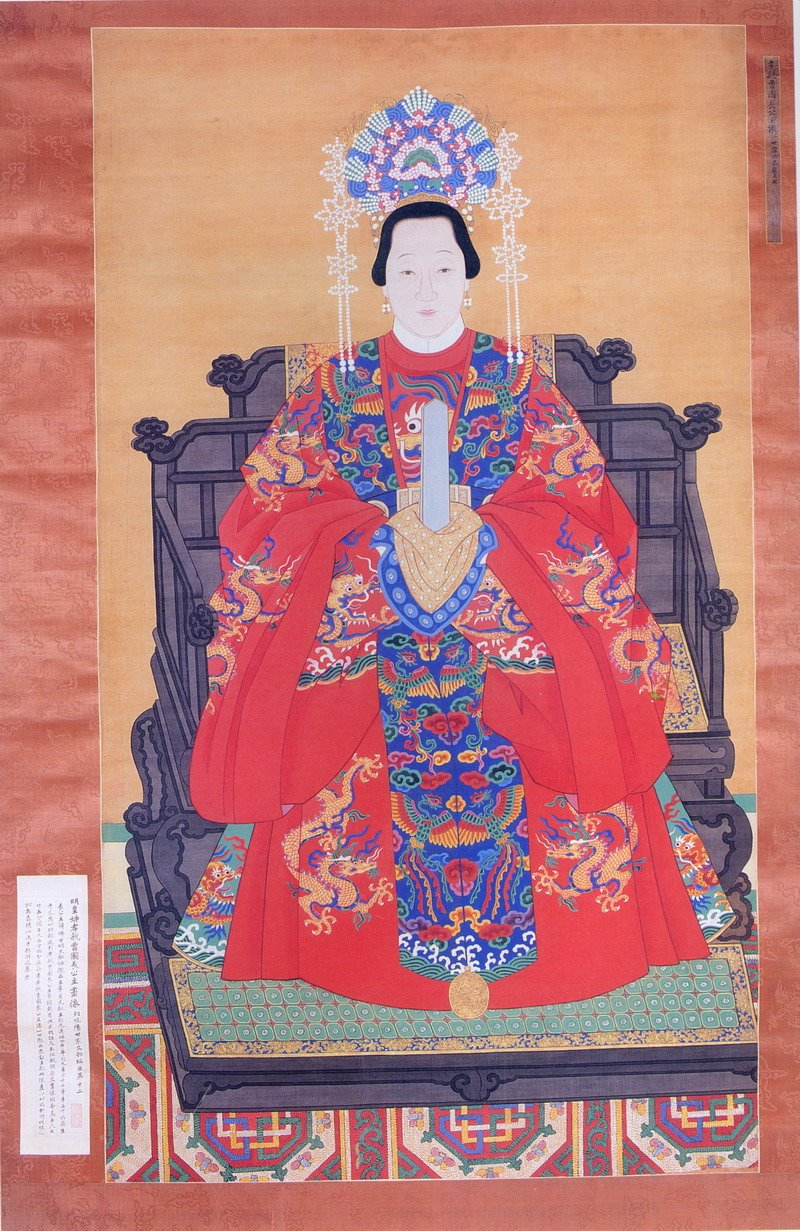
Ming dynasty noblewomen wearing a blue embroidered xiapei over her red robe

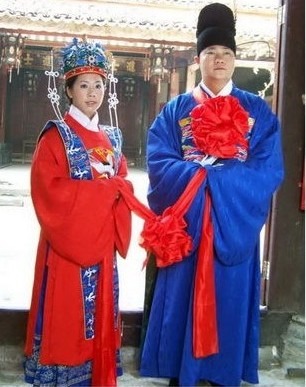
Reconstruction of Ming dynasty fengguan xiapei.

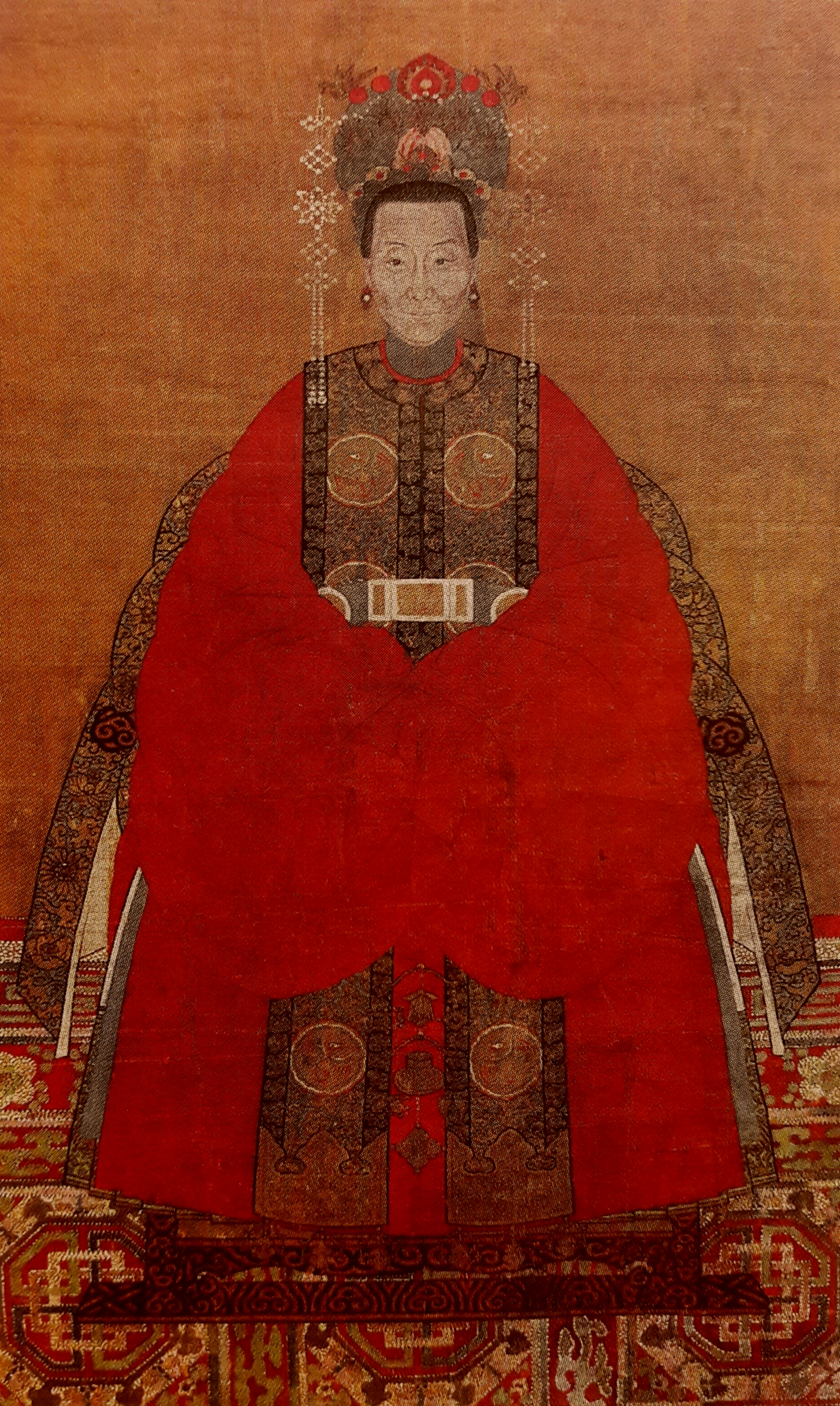
Portrait of lady in fengguan xiapei in Qing dynasty,
