= Xiapei =

Type of Chinese scarf, neckband or waistcoat

- Portrait of Empress Dowager Du wearing scarf-like xiapei over her shoulders; a peizhui (ornament) is hanging at the front end, Song dynasty.

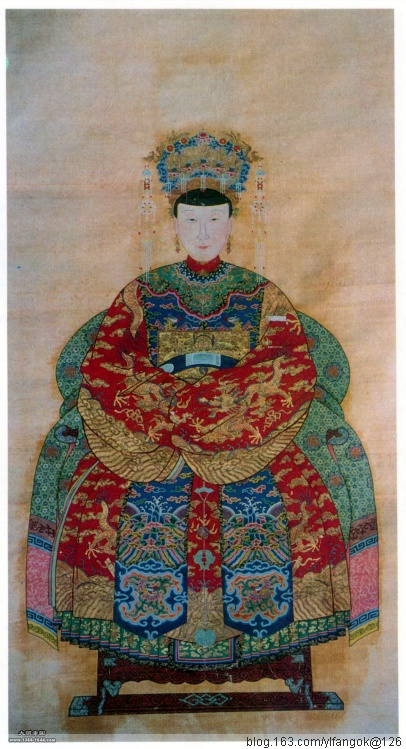
- Portrait of Mrs Chen wearing the waistcoat-like xiapei, Qing dynasty

Chinese name
- Chinese: 霞帔
- Literal meaning: "Rosy cloud scarf" or "Rosy cloud cape"
Transcriptions
Standard Mandarin
- Hanyu Pinyin: xiápèi

Alternative Chinese name
- Chinese: 霞帔坠
- Literal meaning: Rosy cloud scarf pendant
Transcriptions
Standard Mandarin
- Hanyu Pinyin: Xiápèizhuì

Korean name
- Hangul: 하피
- Hanja: 霞帔
- Literal meaning: Rosy cloud cape
Transcriptions
- Revised Romanization: hapi

Xiapei (Chinese: 霞帔; lit. 'Rosy cloud scarf'), also known as hapi (Korean: 하피; Hanja: 霞帔) in Korea, is a type of Chinese clothing accessory in either the form of a long scarf, a neckband, or in the shape of waistcoat depending on the time period. It was also referred as xiapeizhui (Chinese: 霞帔坠) when it was ornamented with a peizhui (Chinese: 帔坠; pinyin: pèizhuì; lit. 'pendant') at its front end; the peizhui ornament could be made of diverse materials, such as silver, jade, and gold.

The xiapei appeared as early as the Qin dynasty and continues to be worn until now (although the shape of the xiapei evolved with time). Since the Song dynasty, peizhui started to be used to ornate the xiapei. In the Ming and Qing dynasties, the xiapei, along with the fengguan, became the daily clothing of queens and the formal clothing of the wives of senior officials. The xiapei eventually became part of the traditional Chinese wedding attire for commoners. The xiapei was also introduced and worn in the late Goryeo and Joseon where it was called hapi; it was bestowed by the Ming dynasty along with the jeokui and many other garment items.

== History ==
=== Qin and Han dynasty ===
The xiapei appears as early as the Qin and Han dynasty and was in the shape of the long, thin-silk scarf.

=== Wei, Jin, Northern and Southern dynasties. ===
During the Wei, Jin, Northern and Southern dynasties, the xiapei was known as embroidered collar.

=== Sui and Tang dynasty ===
In the Sui and Tang dynasties, the xiapei gained its name due to its beauty like rosy clouds (霞; xia). During this period, it became increasingly popular. In the Tang dynasty, the xiapei was an embroidered scarf made of silk which was attached to a woman's neck and shoulder that would wrap around her body.

=== Song dynasty ===
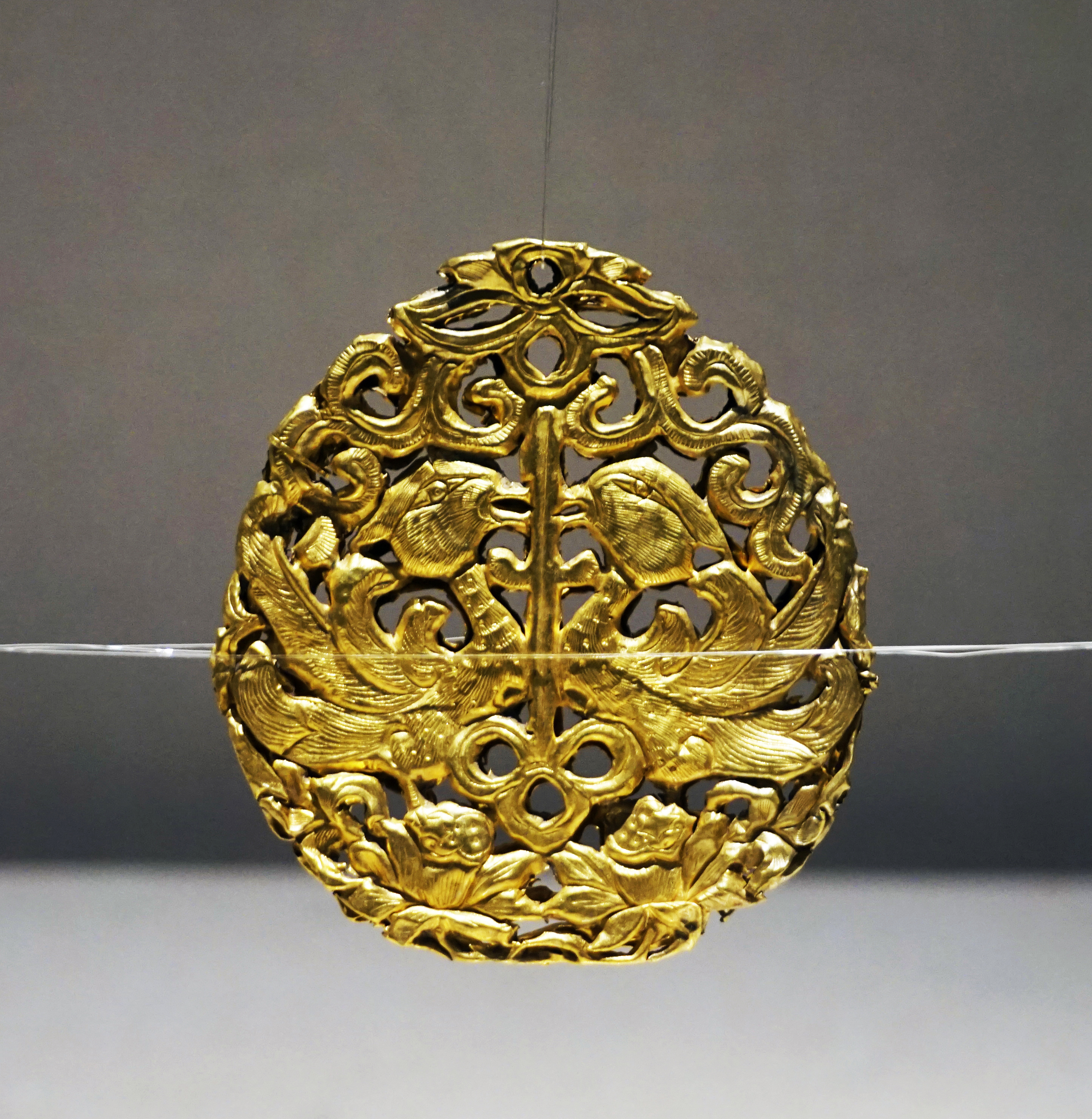
Southern Song gold peizhui, an ornament used to decorate xiapei.

In the Song dynasty, xiapei became a component part of the formal attire; the embellishment of the xiapei in this period were determined according to the social rank of its wearer. Peizhui (帔坠), the ornament which was used to decorate the xiapei, were among the jewelries given by wealthy families and high status families to women on their wedding. Similarly to the way it was worn in the Tang dynasty, the xiapei was still attached to the neck and shoulder of a woman, except that it was repositioned to also hang on her chest in order to display the ornament (i.e. peizhui) which was attached to the front end of the xiapei.

=== Ming dynasty ===
In the Ming dynasty, the xiapei was inherited from the one worn in the Song dynasty. The Ming dynasty xiapei was a form of long embroidered neckband which was trimmed with gold and lace. It was worn by queens as daily attires and by the wives of senior official as a formal attire. It was also used as part of the ceremonial attire for titled women.

During the Hongwu Period (1368 –1398 AD) of the Ming Dynasty, there were specific regulations on what kind of clothing a woman had to wear based on her social rank:

- Women who were given rank of 1st and rank of 2nd by the Ming emperor had to wear a xiapei which was decorated with golden cloud and pheasant patterns embroidery.
- Women who were given the rank of 3rd and 4th had to wear a xiapei which was embroidered with golden cloud and peacock pattern,
- Women who were given the rank of 5th had to wear a xiapei which was embroidered with cloud and mandarin duck pattern,
- Women who were given the rank of 6th and 7th had to wear a xiapei which was embroidered with cloud and magpie pattern,
- Women who were given the rank of 8th and 9th had to wear a xiapei which was embroidered with branch pattern.

The xiapei eventually became part of the wedding attire for commoners.

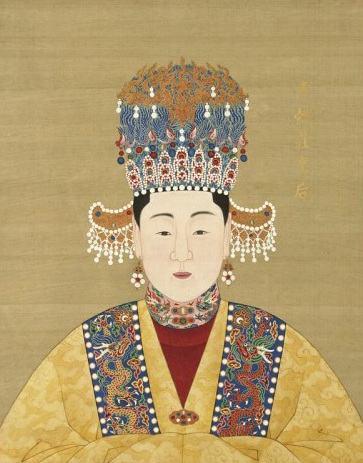
Ming dynasty Empress Xiao yizhuang.

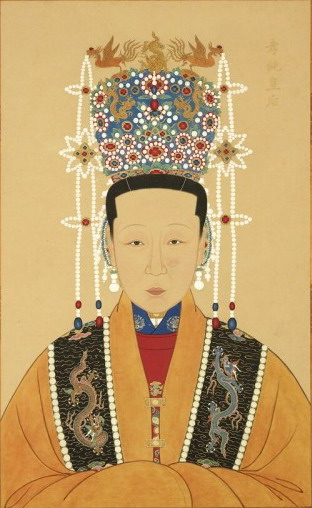
Ming fynasty Empress Xiao Chun

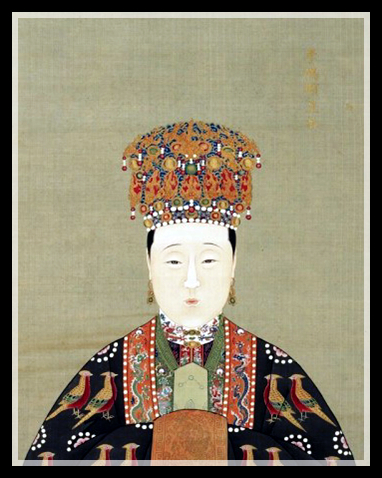
Ming dynasty Empress Xiaoduan

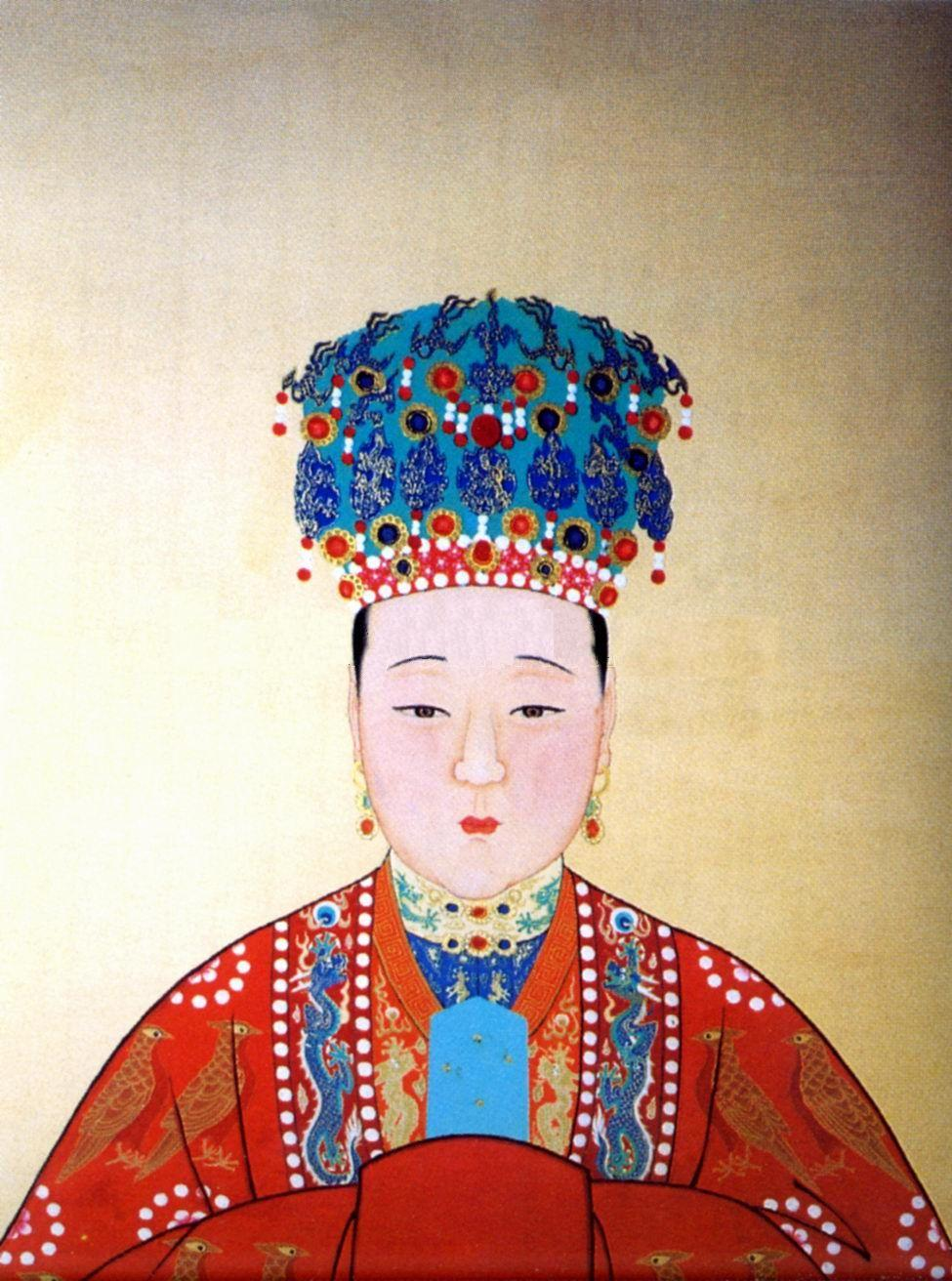
Ming dynasty Empress Xiaoduan wearing xiapei.

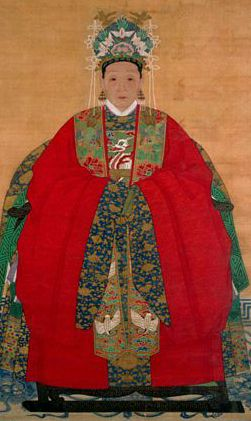
Ming dynasty noblewomen wearing a green embroidered xiapei over her red robe.

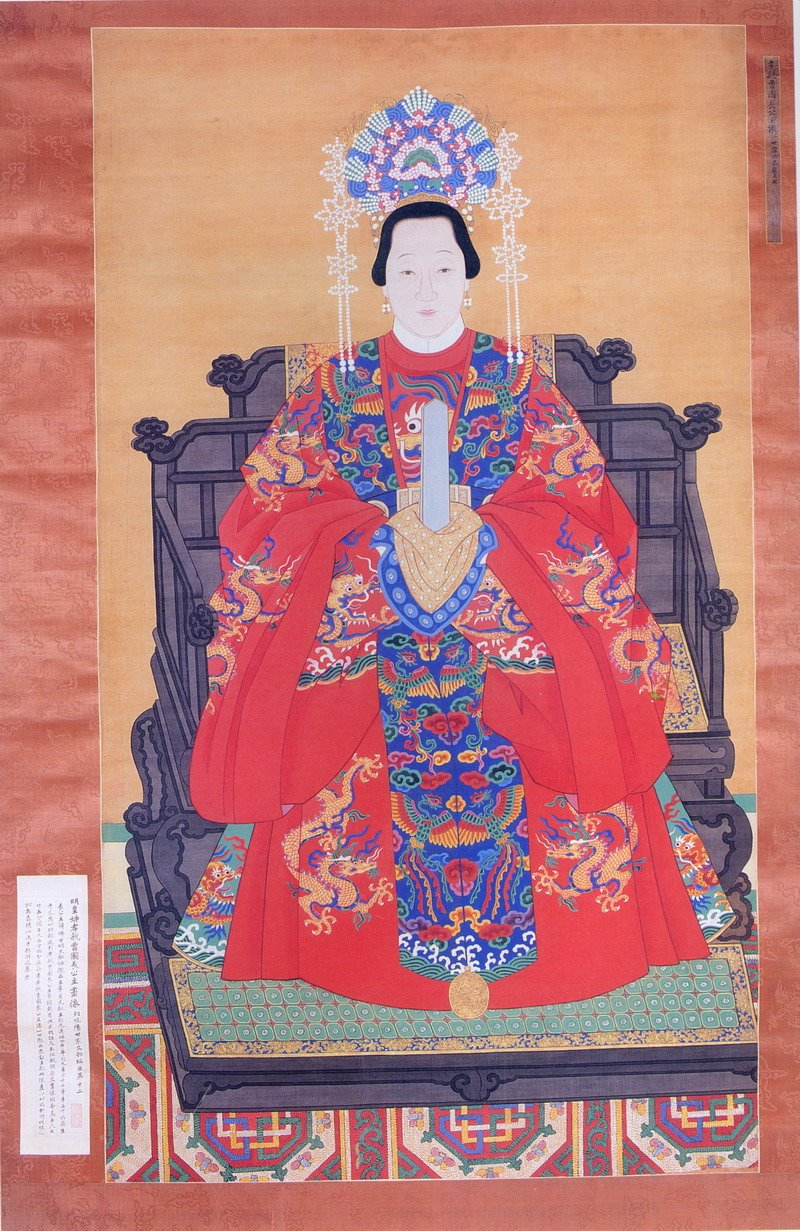
Ming dynasty noblewomen wearing a blue embroidered xiapei over her red robe.

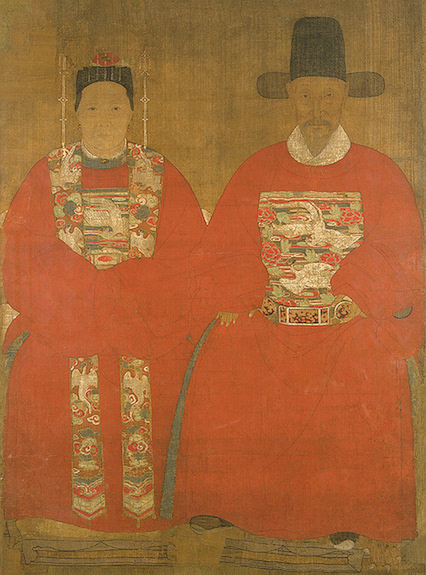
Woman wearing xiapei; portrait of an official woman.

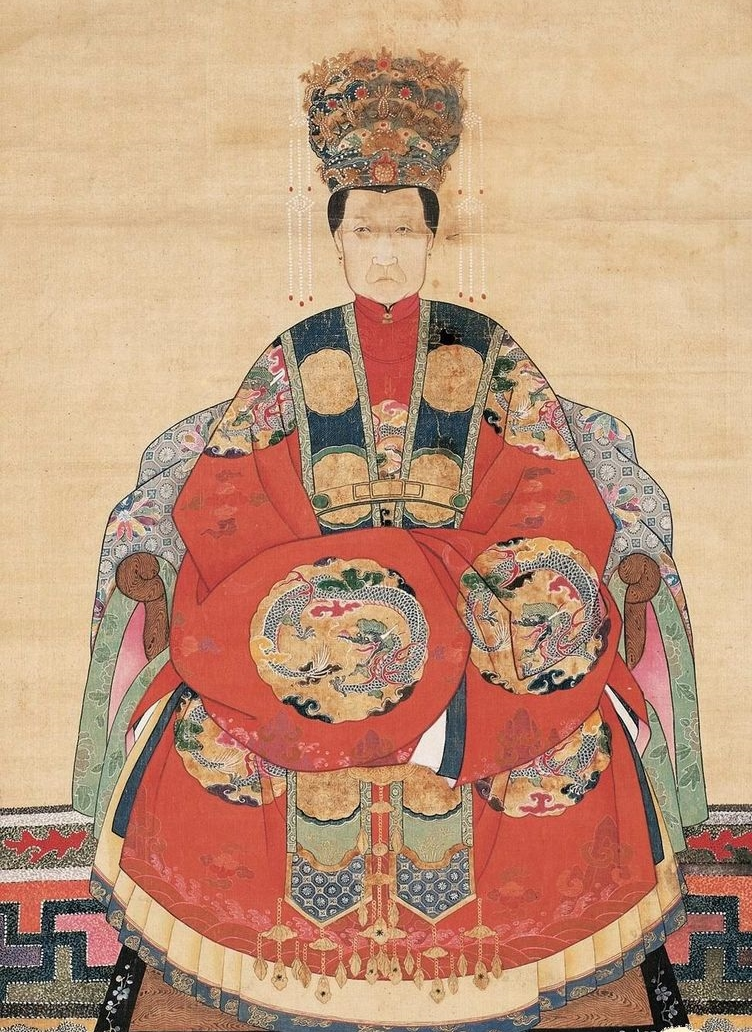
Woman wearing xiapei in late Ming.

=== Qing dynasty ===
In the Qing dynasty, the Ming dynasty xiapei (long scarf) evolved into the Qing dynasty xiapei which was in the form of a sleeveless waistcoat. This waistcoat was made up of 3 pieces:

- The front and back parts which was decorated with the rank badges accordingly to the women's husband ranking, and
- Coloured tassels were decorated the bottom part of the waistcoat.
- The waistcoat-shaped xiapei was tied at the sides, reached below the knee and had a fringed pointed bottom hem.

Similarly to the Ming dynasty, the waistcoat xiapei was worn by the queens as a daily form of attire while the wives of senior official as a formal attire. Throughout the Qing dynasty, Han Chinese women, following the Ming dynasty customs, would wear the xiapei on their wedding day. The xiapei was actually first worn as part of the Wedding attire and after the wedding, it would be worn for special events. Ordinary women wear allowed to wear xiapei on rare occasion, such as weddings and funerals.

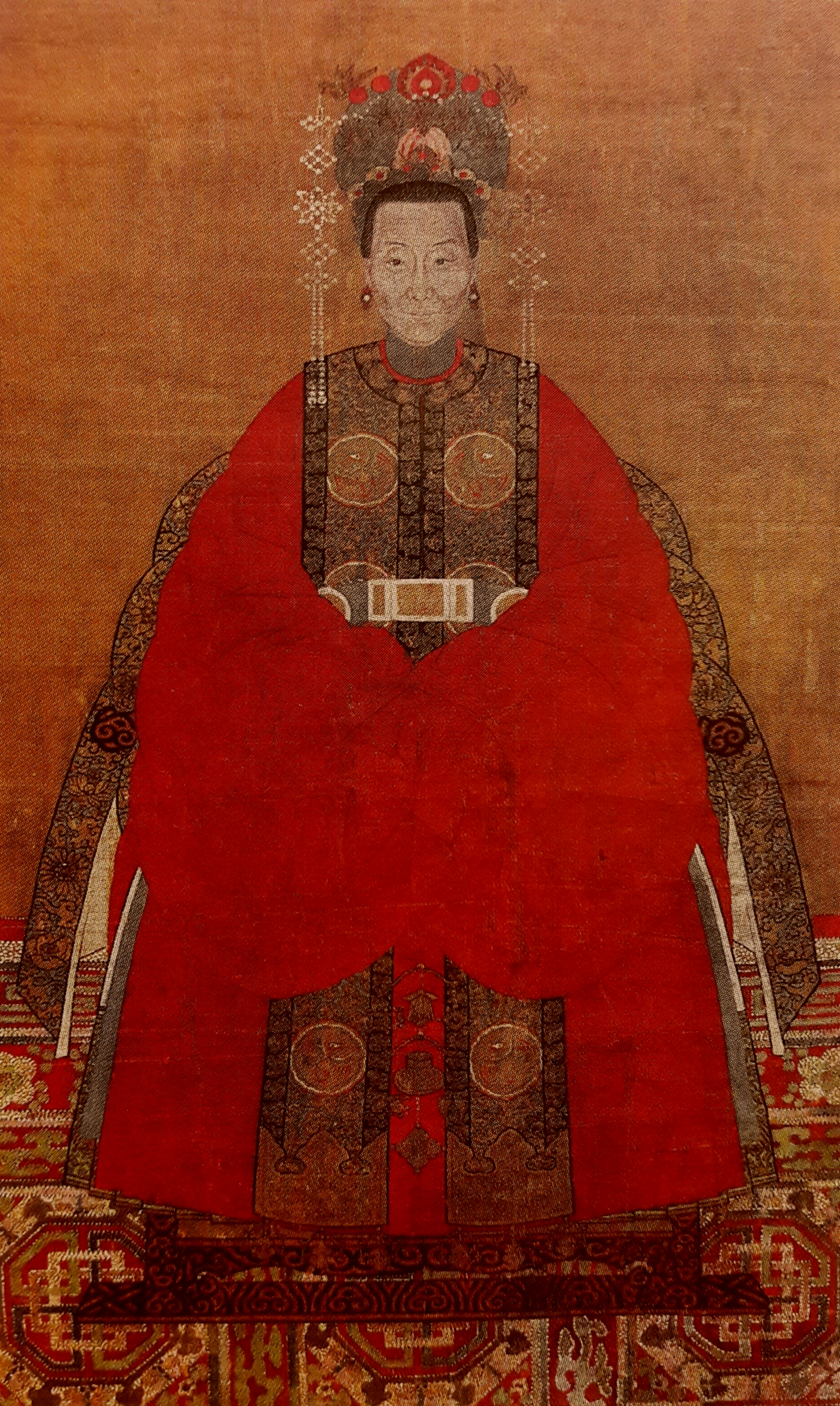
Qing dynasty lady in a red robe and xiapei over shoulders.

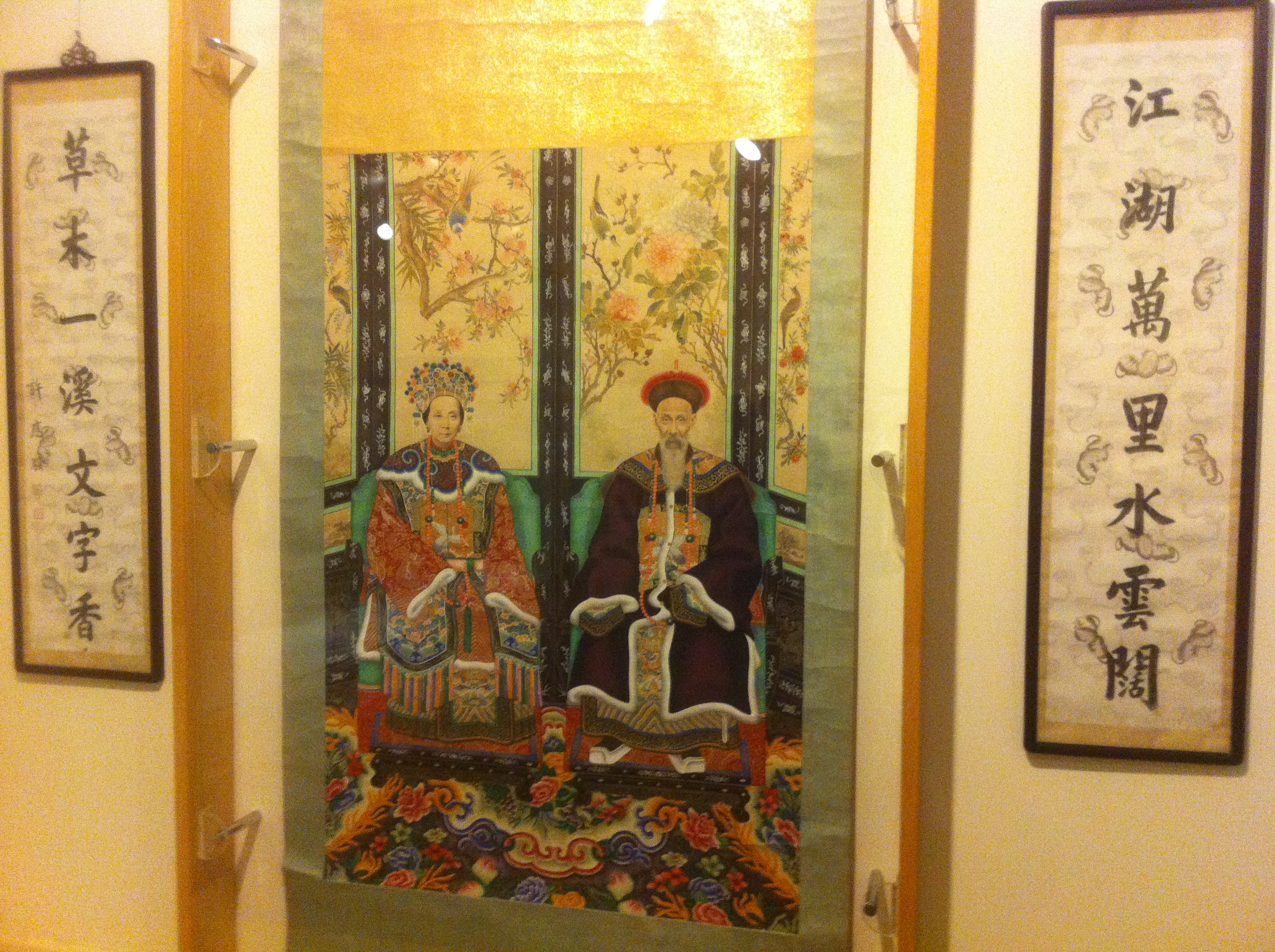
Chinese woman wearing xiapei, Xu Family of Guangzhou Chinese officials, Qing dynasty.

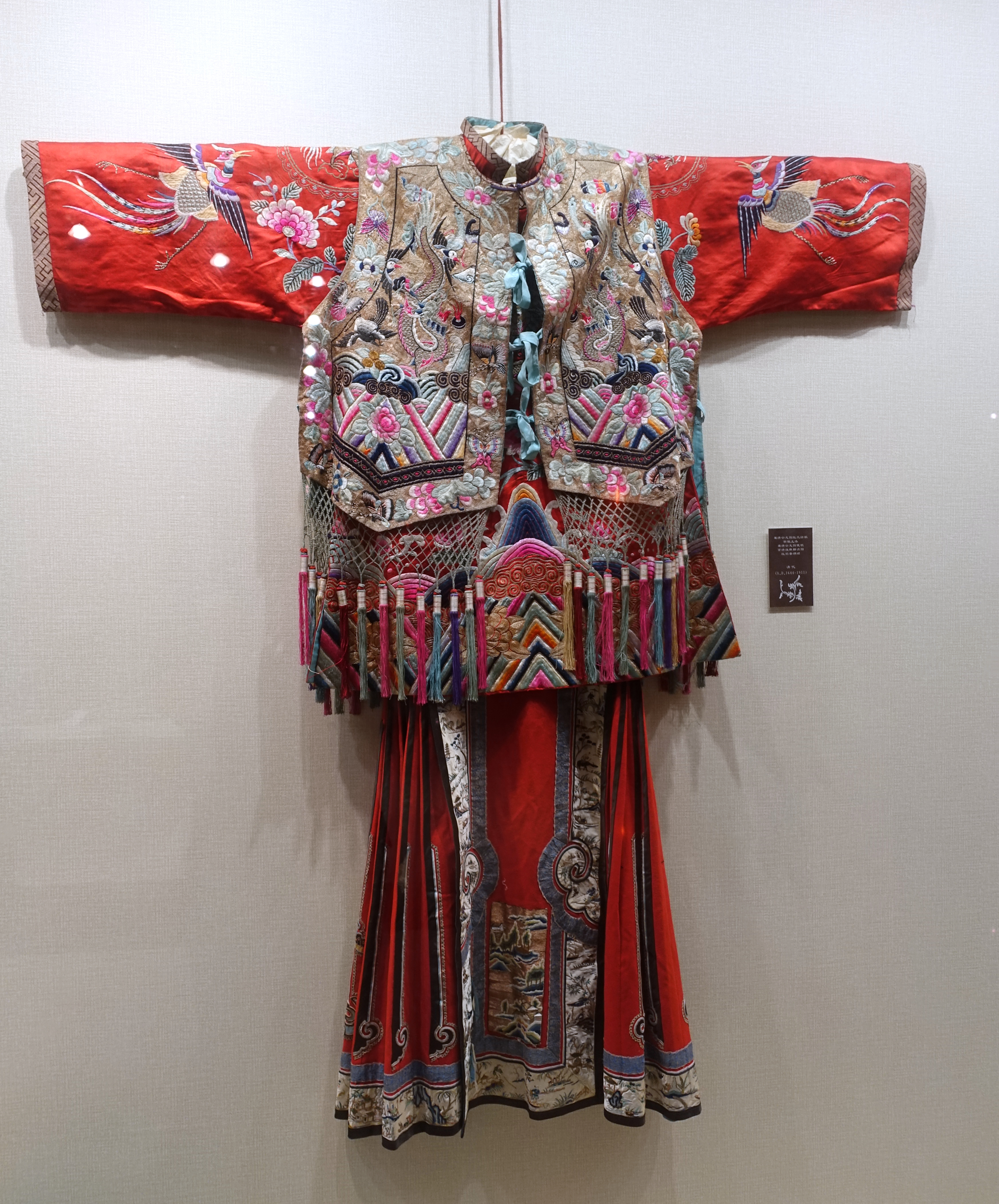
Waistcoat-like xiapei, Qing dynasty.

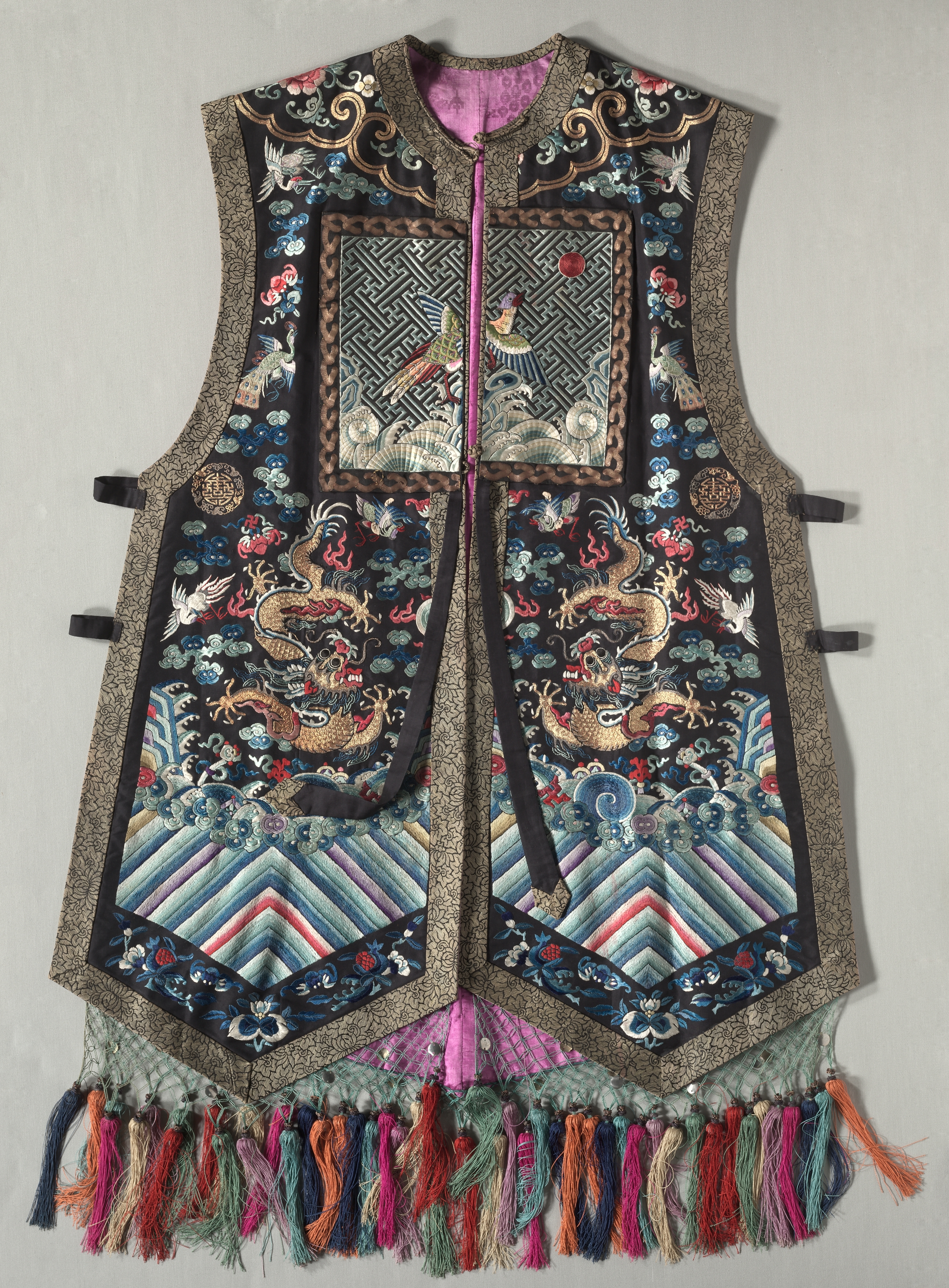
Women's waistcoat-like xiapei, Qing dynasty, late 19th century.

== Korea ==
The xiapei was called hapi in Korea; it was a long, wide piece of black silk which was worn over the shoulders. Hapi was an ornamental garment and was a ceremonial cape which was worn by the queens, crown princess, and royal women (including the consort of the crown prince, the consort of the crown prince's son, the queen dowager, and the grand queen dowager) along with the jeokui.

The hapi was worn in Korea from the late Goryeo to the wedding ceremony of King Yeongchin in 1922. The hapi was bestowed by the Ming dynasty and was included in the set of ceremonial attire sent to the queen. According to the Annals of Joseon, from 1403 to the first half of the 17th century the Ming Dynasty sent a letter, which confers the queen with a title, along with the hapi and many other items.

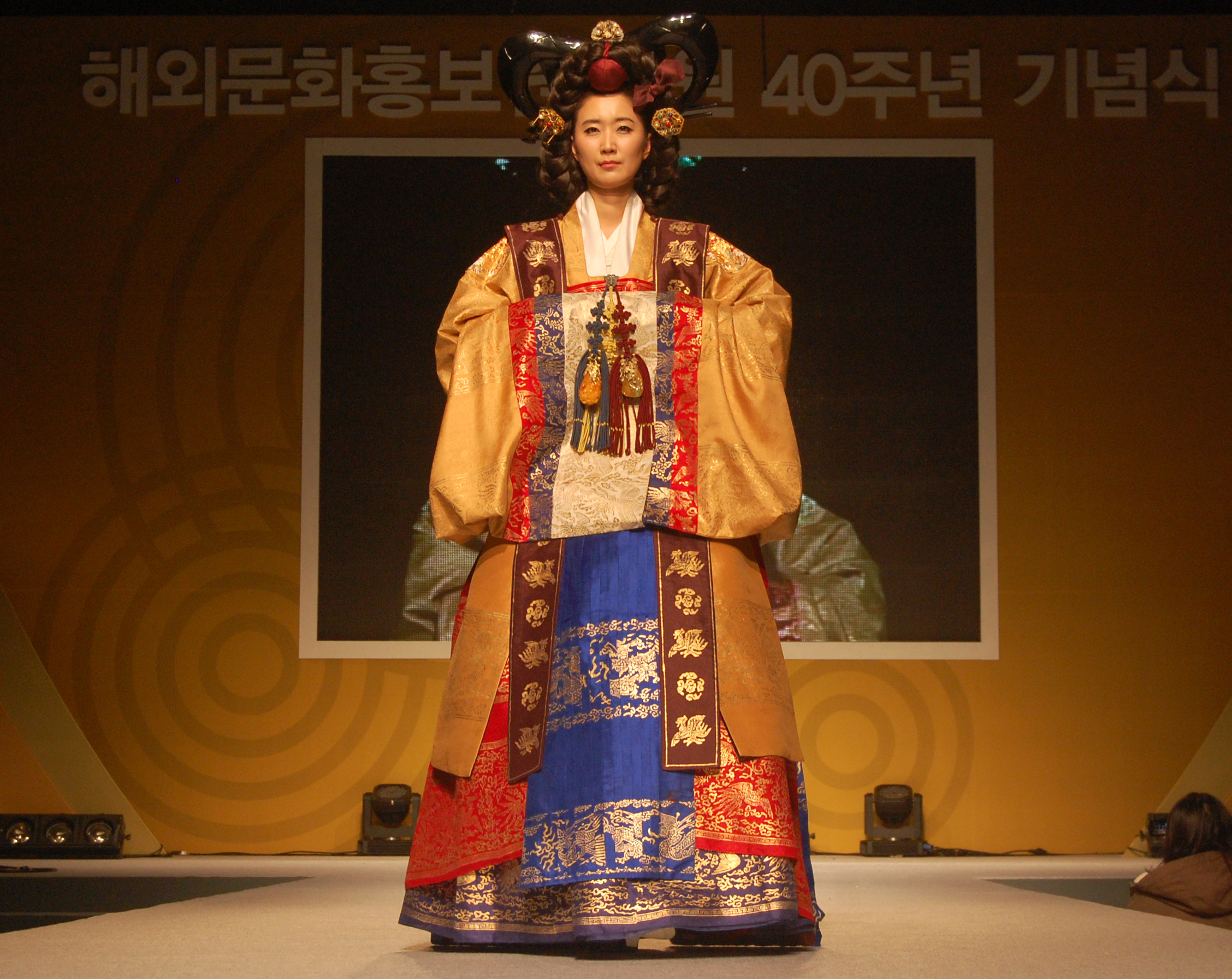
Hapi (black silk band with gold ornament motifs) is worn over the shoulders.

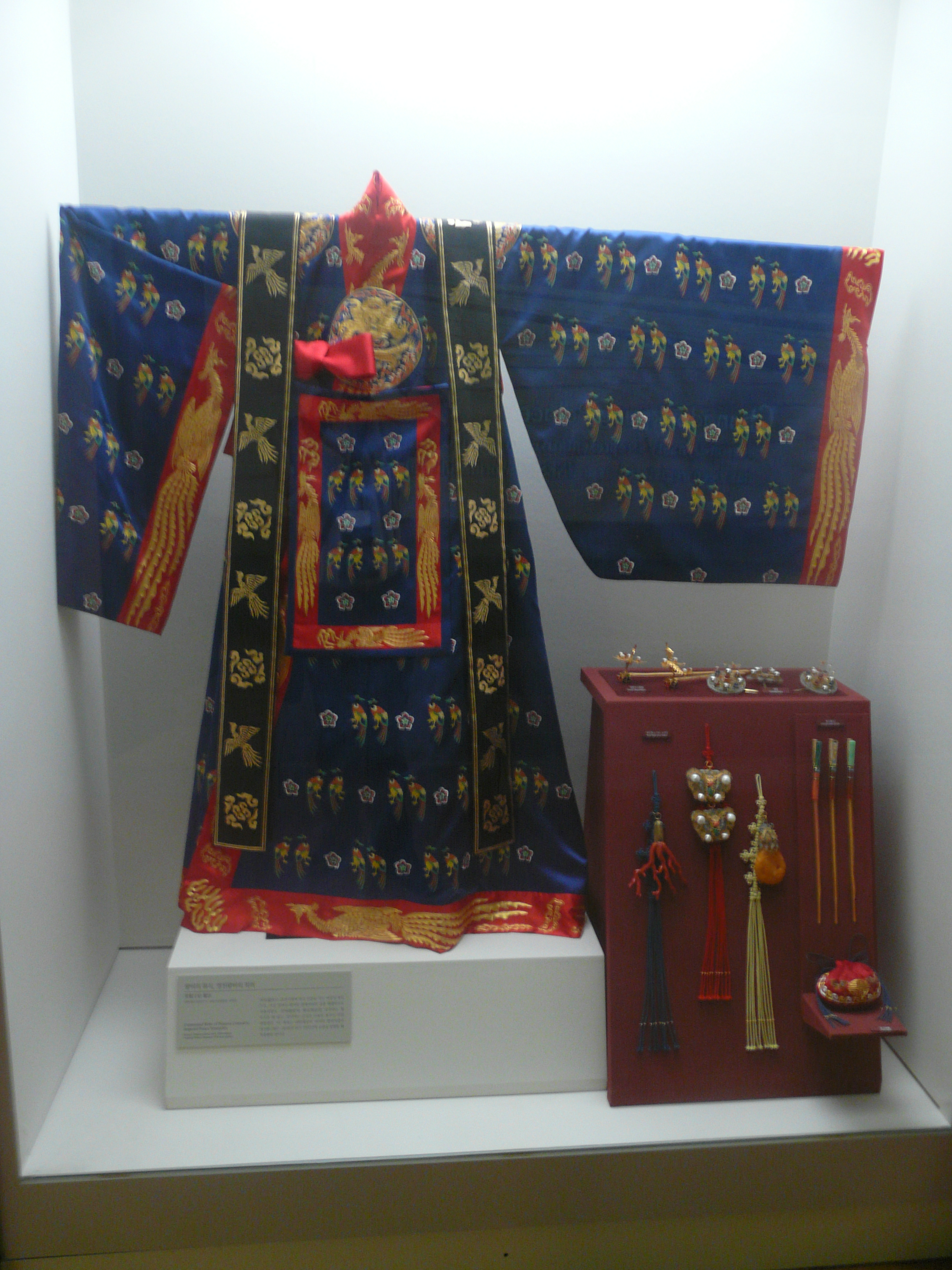
Black hapi worn on top of jeokui.

== See also ==
- Fengguan
- Qixiong ruqun
- Yuanlingshan
- Guan Li
- List of Hanfu
- Hanfu footwear
