= Frog (fastening) =

Fastening in the form of an ornamental knot

Pankou (Frog)
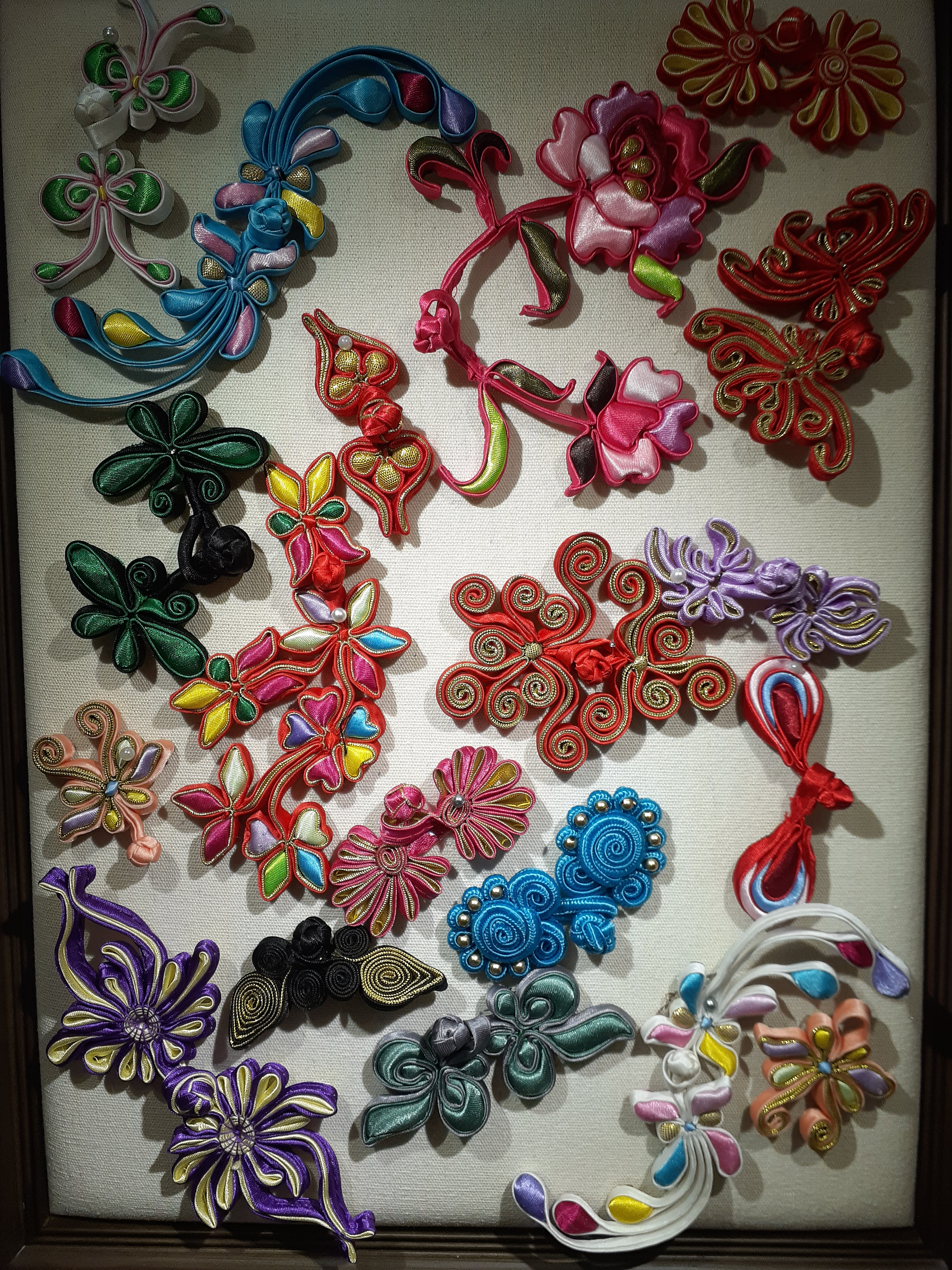
- Floral pankou, typically used on cheongsam, China
- Type: Fastening made of fabric
- Material: Diverse, including silk
- Place of origin: At least the Song dynasty (960–1279 AD), China

Pankou

Chinese name
- Traditional Chinese: 盘扣
- Simplified Chinese: 盤扣
Transcriptions
Standard Mandarin
- Hanyu Pinyin: Pánkòu

Huaniu
- Chinese: 花纽
- Literal meaning: Flower buttons
Transcriptions
Standard Mandarin
- Hanyu Pinyin: Huāniǔ

Panhuaniu
- Chinese: 盘花纽
Transcriptions
Standard Mandarin
- Hanyu Pinyin: Pánhuāniǔ

English name
- English: Frogs, frog closures, decorative toggles

A frog or pankou (simplified Chinese: 盘扣; traditional Chinese: 盤扣; pinyin: pánkòu), also called Chinese frog closure and decorative toggle, (Note: Also known as Huāniǔ (花纽; 'flower buttons') or panhuaniu (盘花纽) in China, or frog knots, or frogs, in English) is a type of ornamental garment closure. Made from braiding, cord, fabric, or covered wire, they consist of a decorative knot button (a Chinese button knot for a traditional Chinese style) and a loop. Its purpose is to fasten garments while providing a decorative element on the clothing. It can be used to fasten openings edge-to-edge, avoiding an overlap. It is especially used on the cheongsam, where the pankou represents the cultural essence of the dress.

The frog was first developed in China; the origin of its later spread, into Europe and beyond, is uncertain. Loop-and-knot fasteners may have developed independently in other cultures. In Western Europe, military uniforms adopted a similar decorative fastener from Hungarian Hussars (who possibly had adapted them from earlier Chinese or earlier Ottoman styles, or may have independently developed an analogous fastener) which then began to appear on the civilian clothing of both genders, such as overcoats, spencers, and pelisses.

Frog fasteners are usual to garments with Chinese-influenced design, such as a shirt or coat with a mandarin collar, which features frog fasteners at the shoulder and down the front of the garment. In the design of a garment, frogging is the use of braided frog fasteners as a detail of the overall design of the garment.

== History ==
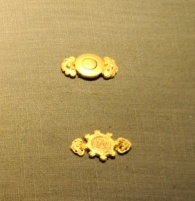
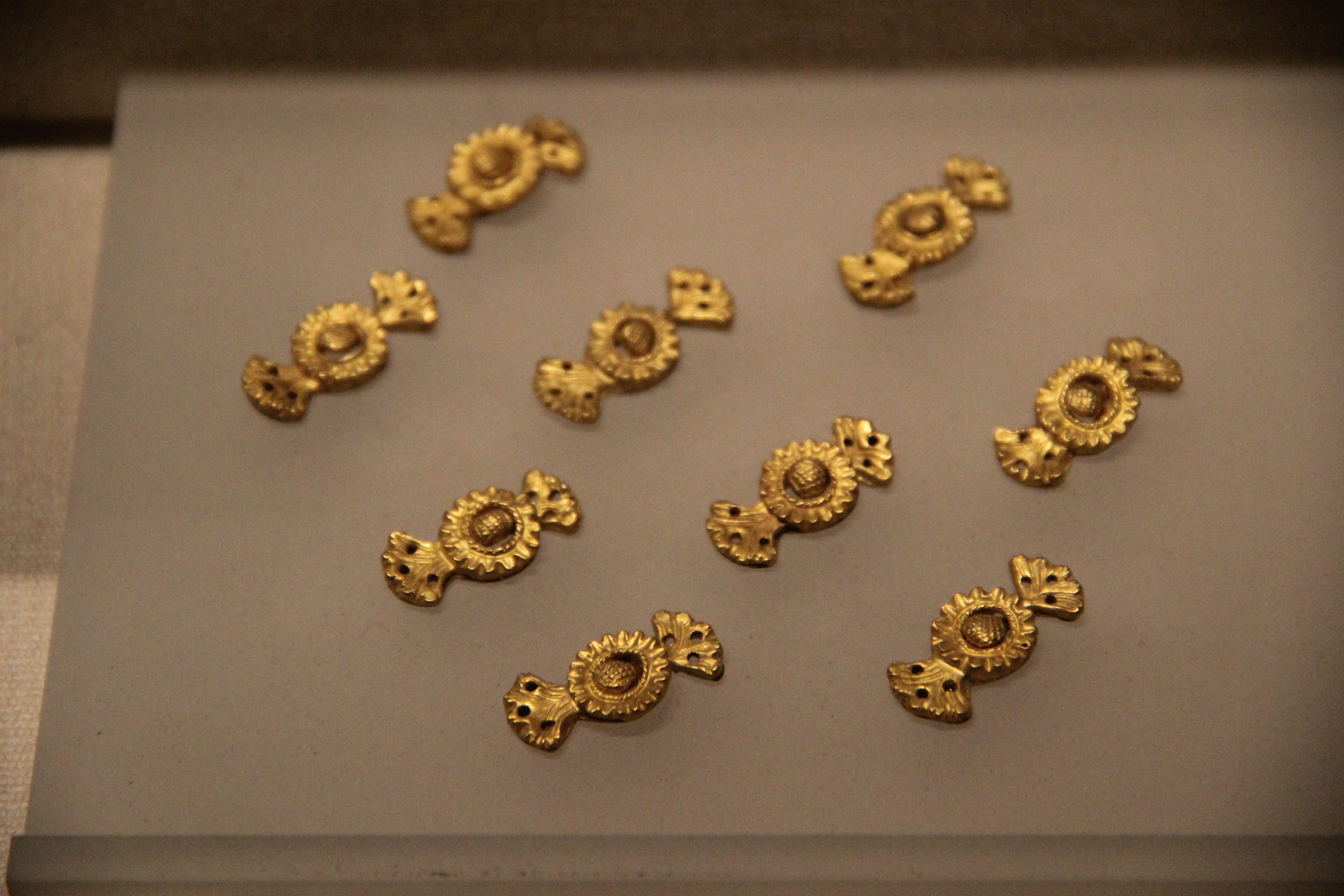
Interlocking metal zimukou from the Ming dynasty, the precursor to the fabric frog

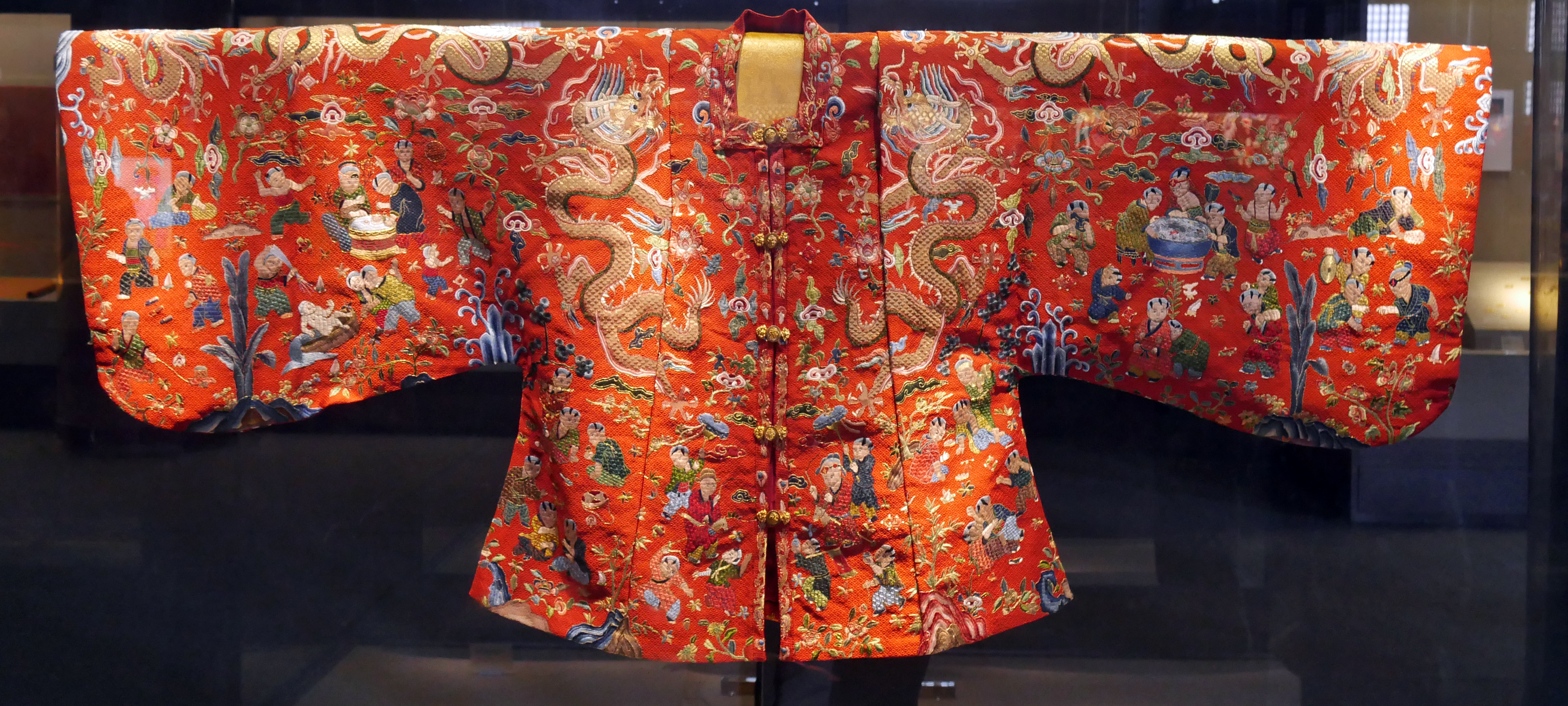
Ming dynasty empress' silk jacket with fastened with zimukou.

=== Development in China ===
The frog developed out of traditional Chinese knotting. As a form of fastener, the frog first appeared on traditional Chinese clothing, and can be traced back to the Song dynasty when fabric was braided into braid buckles to create the loop and the button knot.

The braided buckles of the Song dynasty continued to be used in the Yuan dynasty. However, in the Ming dynasty, interlocking buckles known as zimukou (Chinese: 子母扣; lit. 'child mother button'), which could be made out of gold and silver, first appeared and came in various shapes and styles. The zimukou also became one of the favourite fashion accessory items of the Ming dynasty Chinese women.

These interlocking buckles were not only functional as garments fasteners or as garment ornaments; they also expressed and symbolized the wishes and inspirations of its wearer, such as the longing of a better life; the wishes for a sweet and loving marital relationship through the theme of butterflies and flower (蝶采花); the wishes for a rich and wealthy life with the use of double silver ingots (双银锭), and to express wishes for a long and healthy life with the theme of "Furong Flowers and Shou (芙蓉捧寿), which uses Furong flowers and the Chinese character shou (壽), as it is a homonym for the Chinese characters fushou (福壽) which can literally be translated as 'prosperity and longevity'.

The development of the zimukou of the Ming dynasty had a significant impact on the history of Chinese fashion as they did not only laid the foundation of the subsequent usage of a large number and variety of frog but also led to the emergence and the popularity of the Chinese high-standing collar (and its derivative, the Mandarin collar) along with a variety of duijin yi (upper garment with central front closure) which uses the frog on the front over the succeeding centuries.

The frog, like its Ming dynasty predecessor, the zimukou, also come in all kind of styles and shapes and continue to retain traditional Chinese designs and cultural meanings rooted deeply in traditional Chinese culture; these designs include auspicious symbols, such as pomegranates, which represent fertility, and the Chinese character shou (壽).

=== Styles from Europe ===
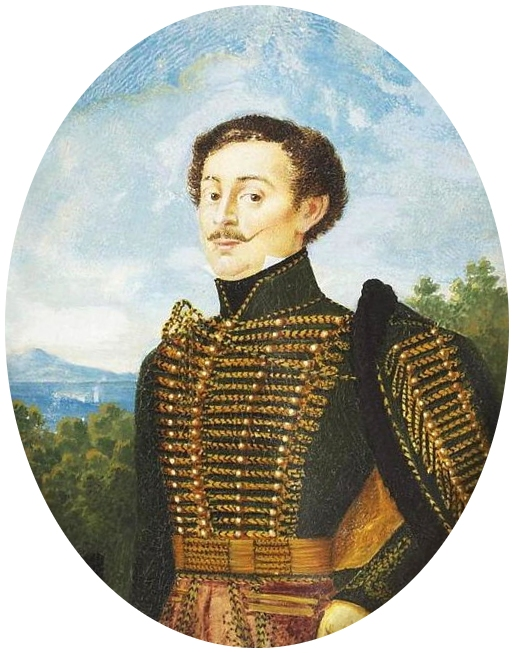
Portrait of a Nobleman wearing Hussar Dress, by Miklós Barabás (1833)

Frogs and frogging became an important decorative feature on military uniforms from the 17th–19th centuries. This was particularly evident for prestigious regiments, especially cavalry or hussars, and gave rise to the German term for frogging in general, Husarentressen. These dolman jackets were tight-fitting and dominated by extensive frogging, often in luxurious materials such as gold, silver or brass metallic cording or brocades. With the wide-reaching campaigns of Napoleon, the French military was in extensive contact with different cultures and their styles. Observing the use of frog closures in the Hungarian military and other eastern cultures, the French Military adopted them for own military garments. The French were influential in the spread of frogging throughout Europe and into the Americas.

The frogging was often far more than was necessary for fastening. In some cases, it even became non-functional, with a concealed opening beneath it and the original jacket opening becoming a false detail. By the later 19th century, for lower-grade uniforms down to postal deliverers, telegraph boys and hotel pages, the frogging cordage would be retained as a decoration but there would be no corresponding toggle or opening with it.

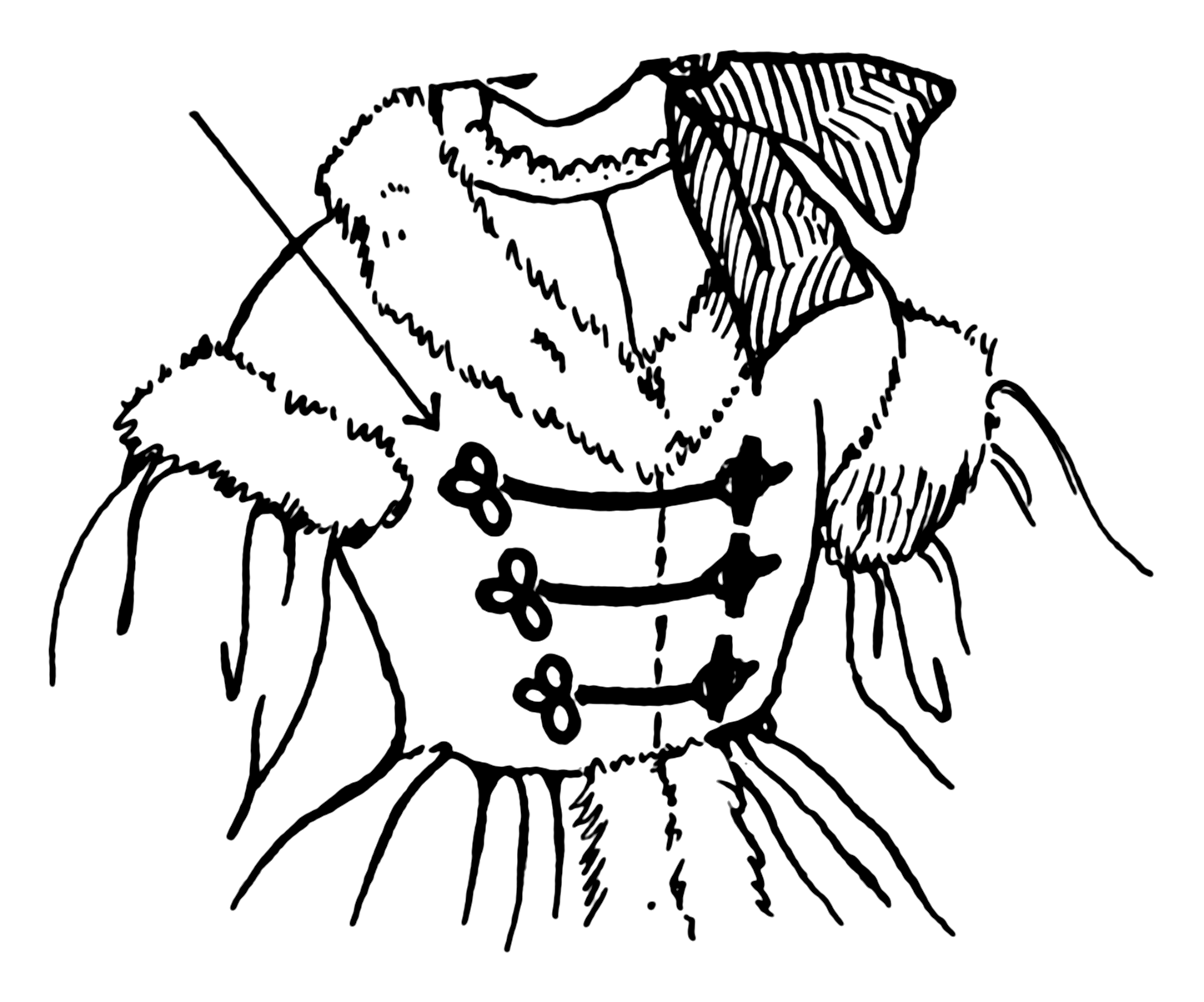
Frog fasteners on the bodice opening of a dress

In the United States, the frog fasteners were adopted during the War of 1812; however when the army regulations tried to promote a less European look, it was decided that the elaborate and complex frog fasteners would be replaced with more simple cotton cord loops.

== Production ==
The frog or pankou is composed of two parts: a Chinese button knot or other decorative knot (or even a toggle) on one side; and a loop attached on the opposite side, through which the knot is passed and which holds it in place. The knot is perceived as the male element, while its paired loop is considered the female.

Ready-made frogs are available for purchase, but the range of styles is generally narrow. Sewers may make their own, in a variety of styles, customizing them for their end use. Braid, cord-filled bias tubing, or fabric-covered wire is used to fashion the customized frogs or pankou. They can be made from self-fabric to match, but many are chosen to be a contrasting colour: they serve as decorative structural elements on the garment.

Frogs can be made by looping and interlocking the cording or fabric tube into the desired design, then securing the places where the cords touch by hand-sewing. The frog is then stitched onto a garment, usually by hand. When a fabric tube is used, the fabric is cut on the bias. This allows the fabric tube to remain smooth and flex easily when bent into curves.

== Modern pankou in Chinese culture ==
Variety of pankou compiled in a book
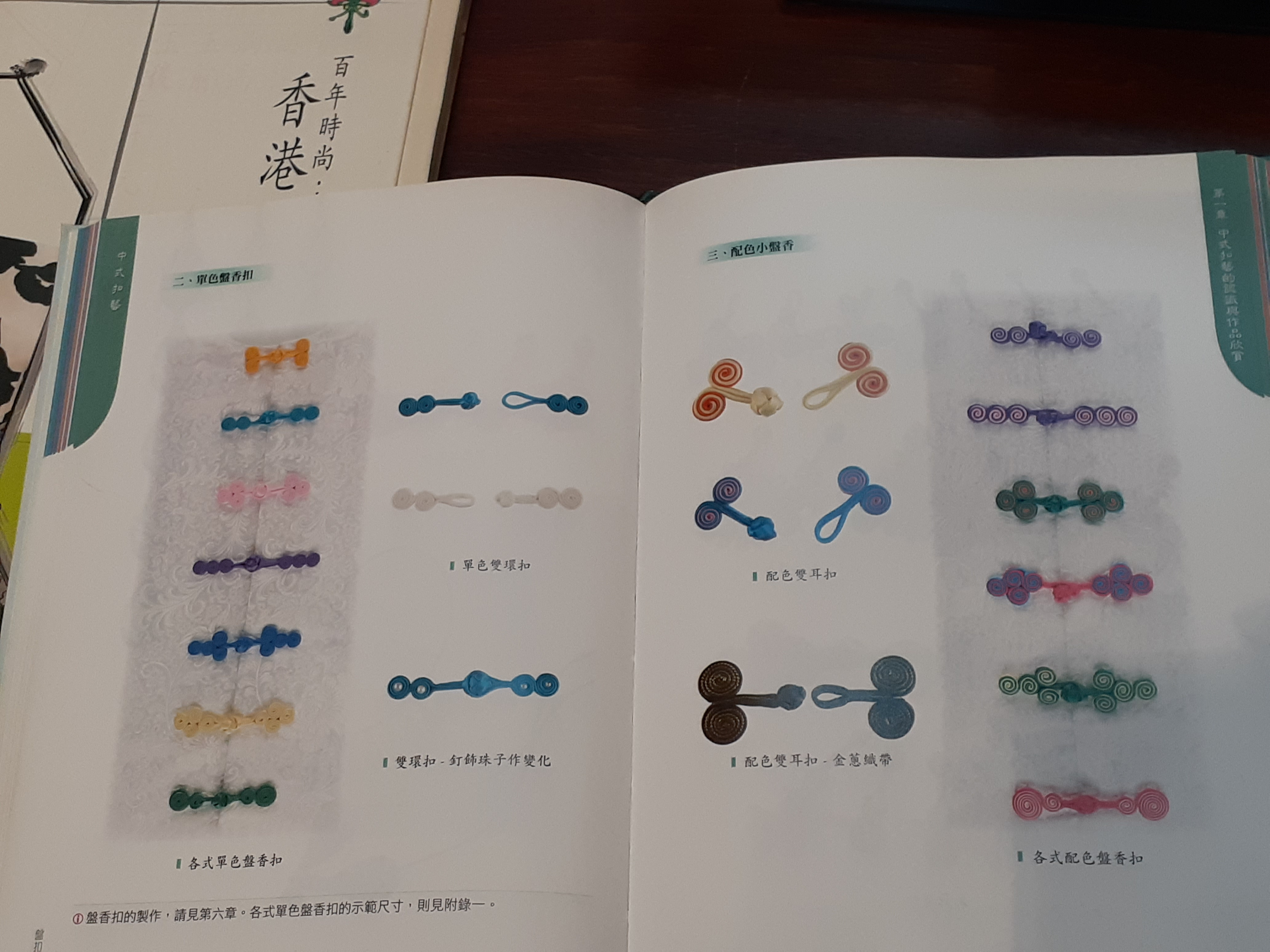
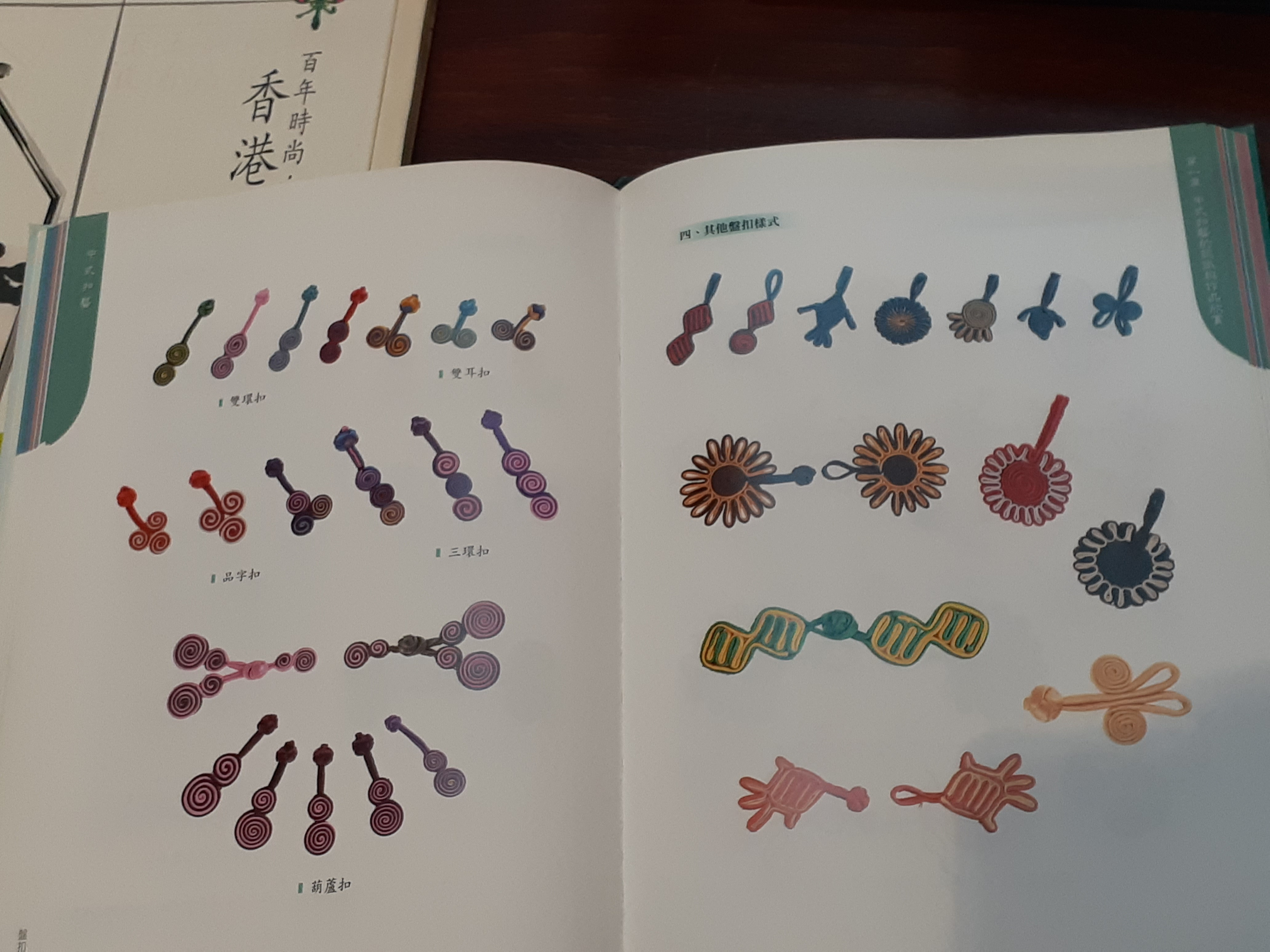
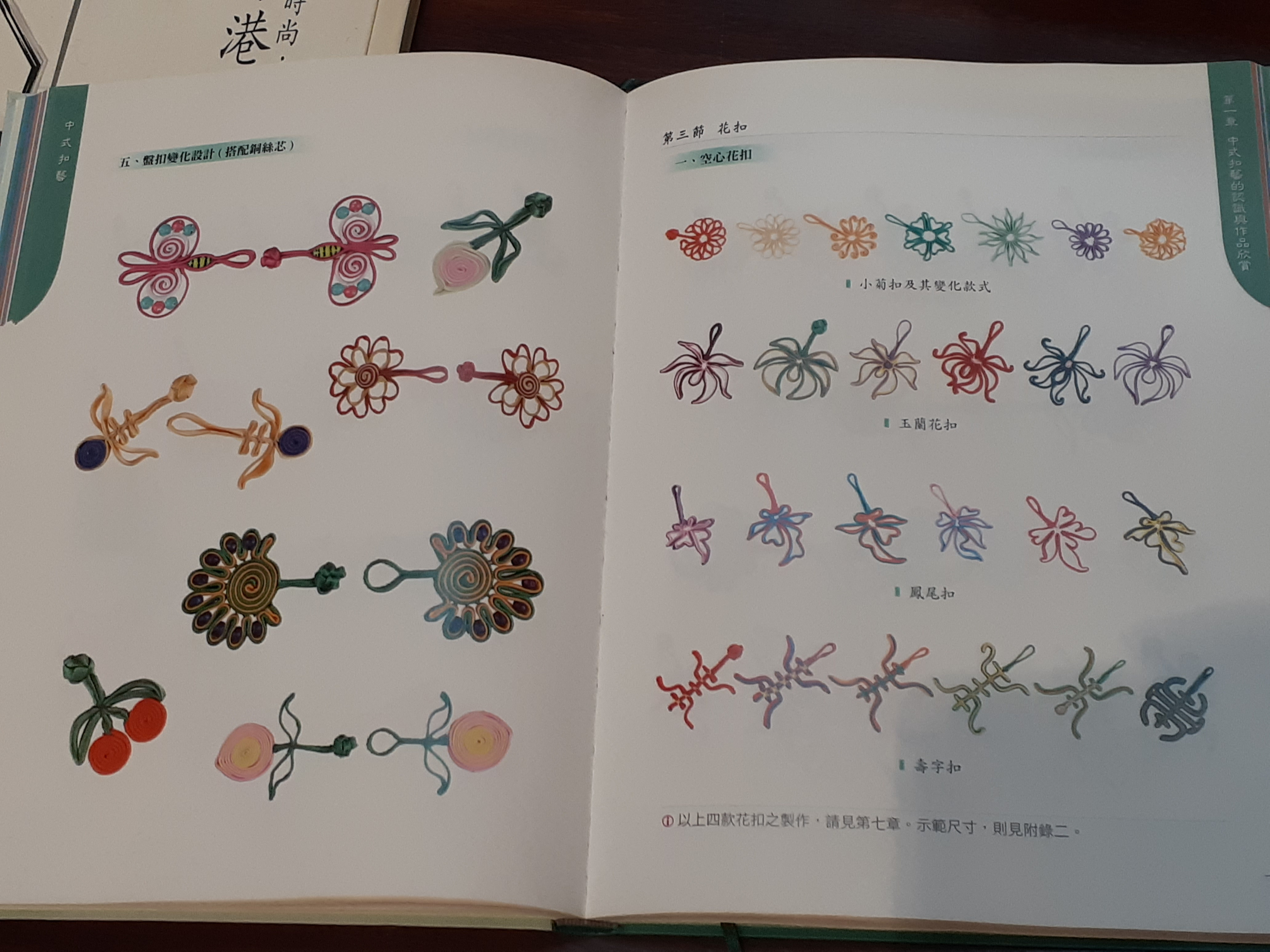
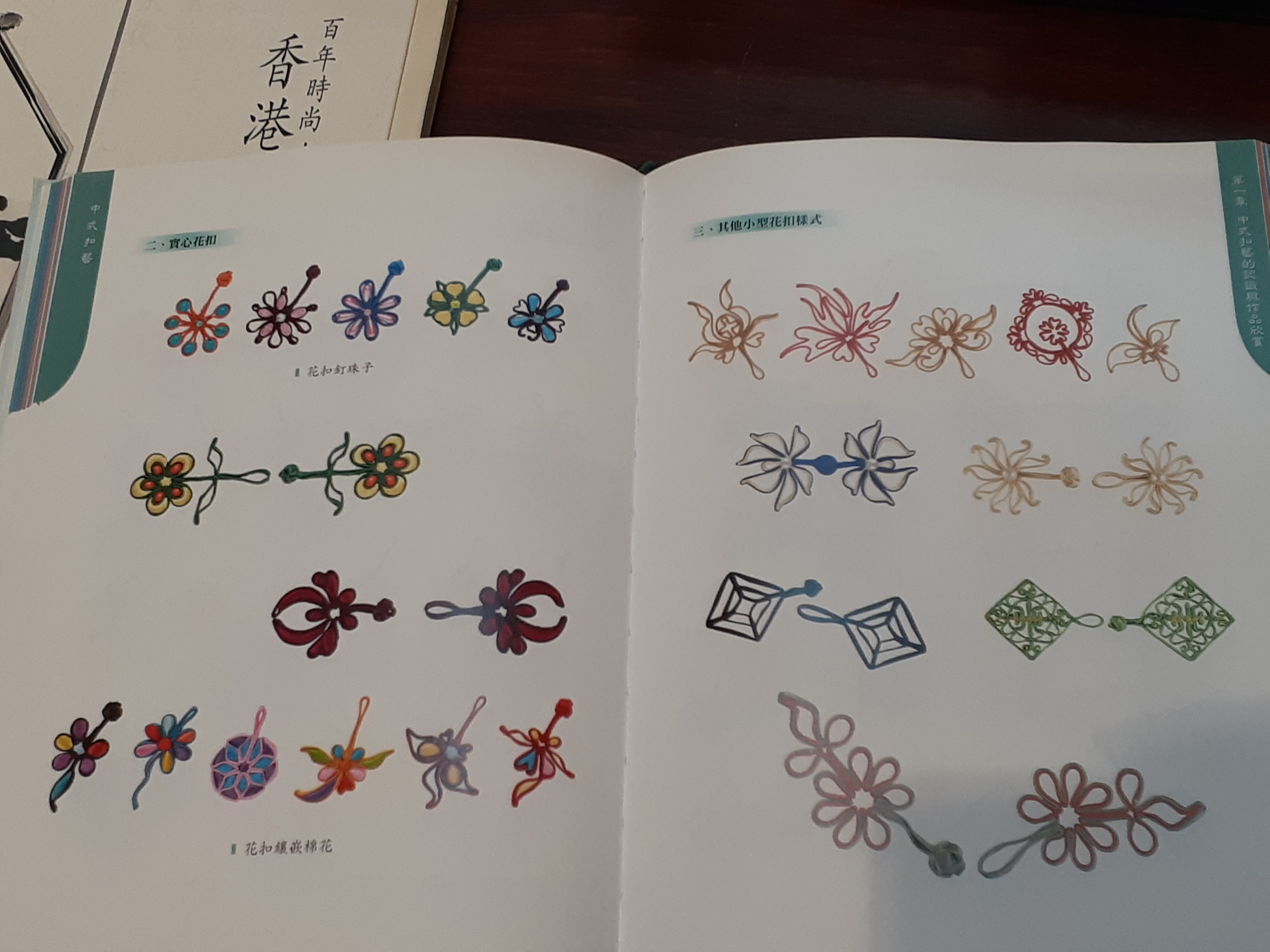
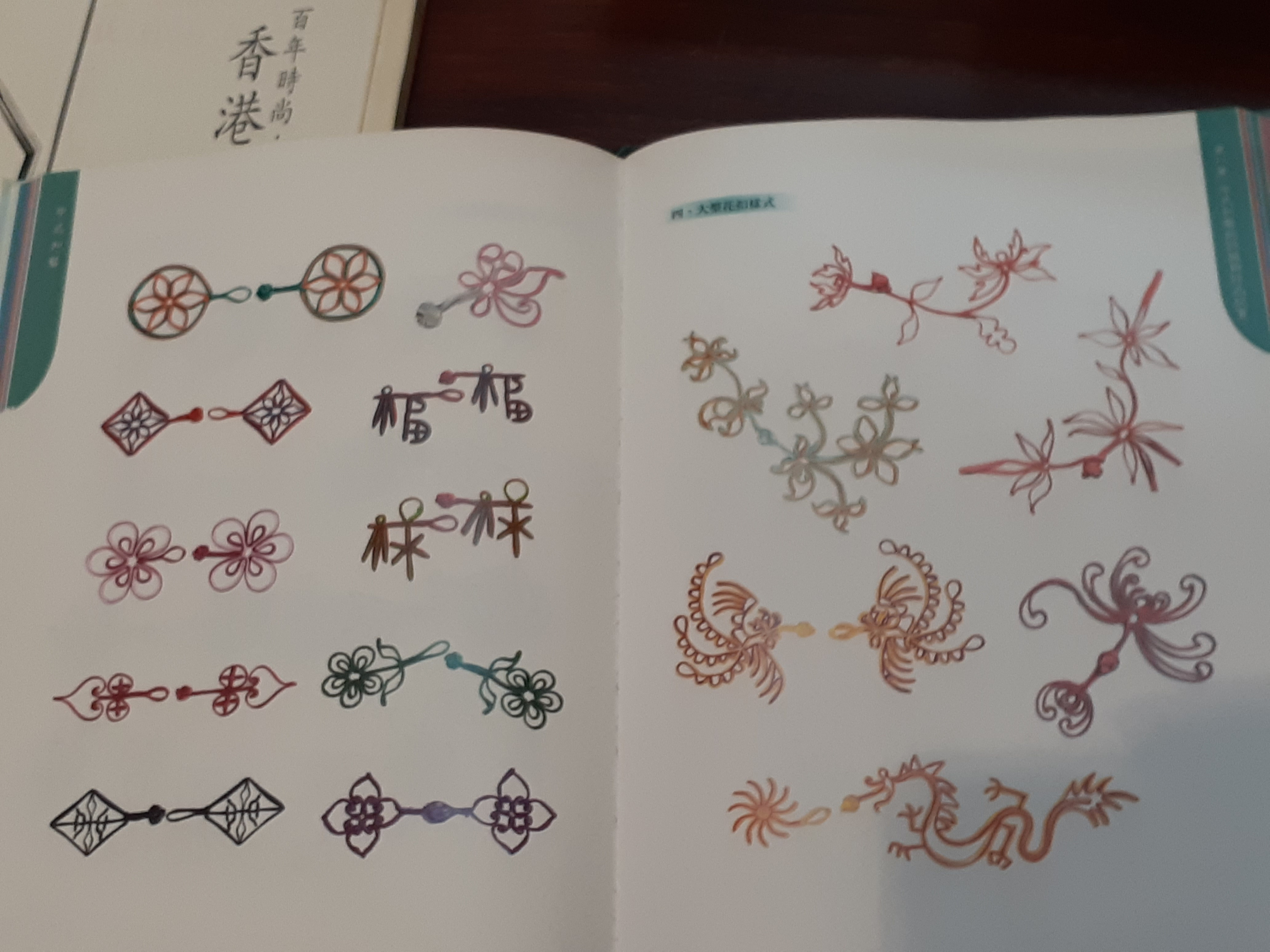

=== Use ===
Frogs are now key elements in cheongsam representing its "soul" and provide a distinctive Chinese character to the dress; they are typically sewn at the centre of the mandarin collar and along the diagonal slanted (S-shaped) opening. They are also used in other garments, such as tangzhuang, gua (jacket) including those used in the qungua, and the changshan, etc.

=== Design and construction ===
The frogs which are used in the making of the cheongsam, are typically made from silk or from the same materials as the dress. To create the more elaborately shaped buttons, a method called wiring is used to construct the desired shape.

Frogs differ in shape and elaboration:

Pankou in Chinese clothing

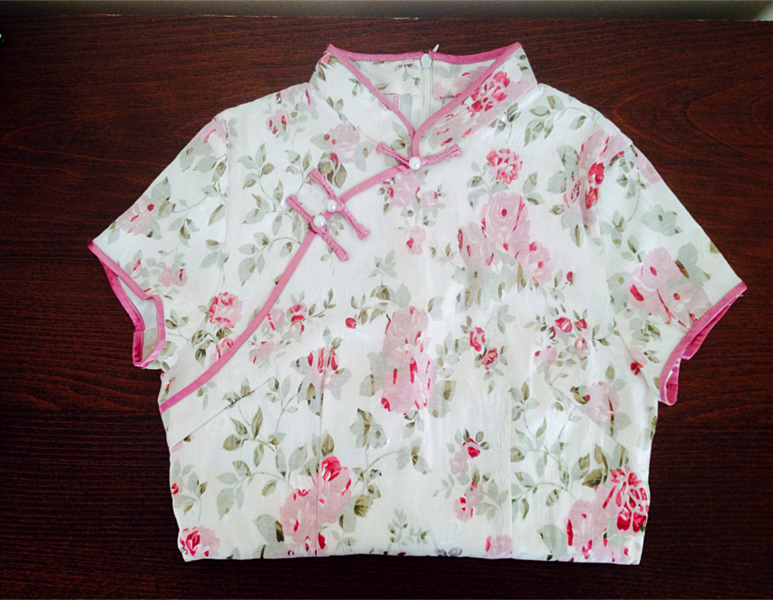
Straight pankou sewed to a cheongsam

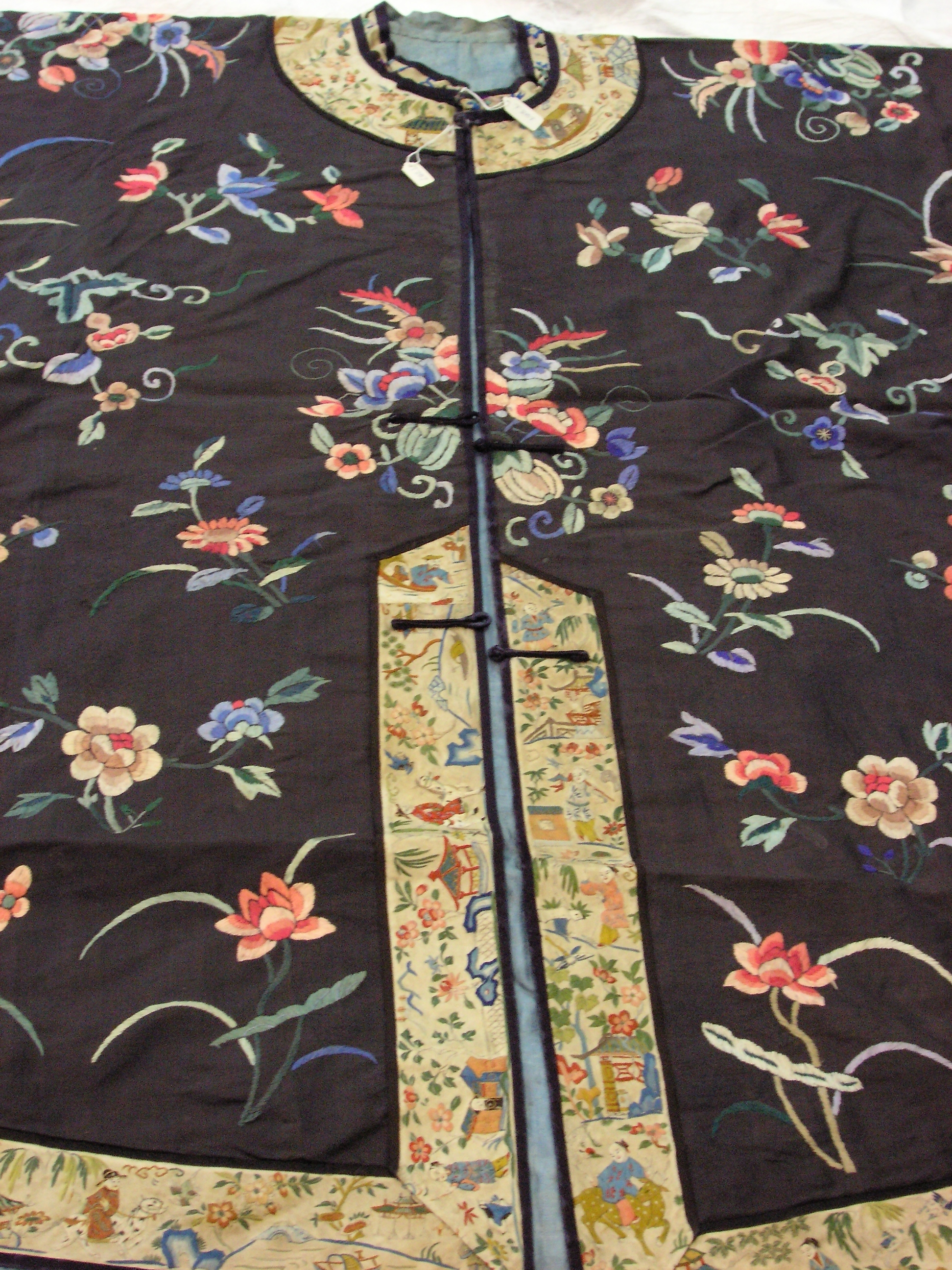
Straight pankou sewed to a gua

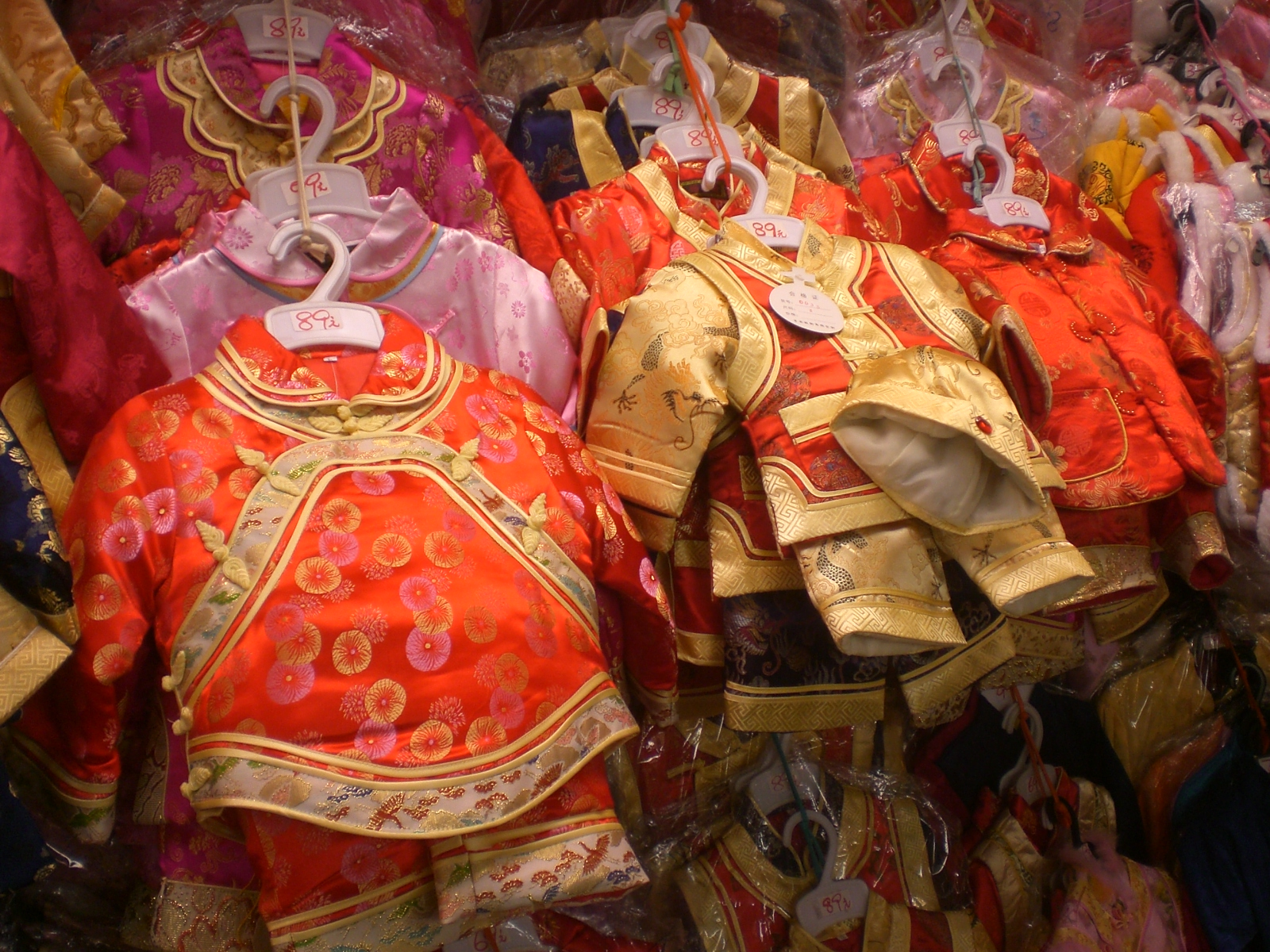
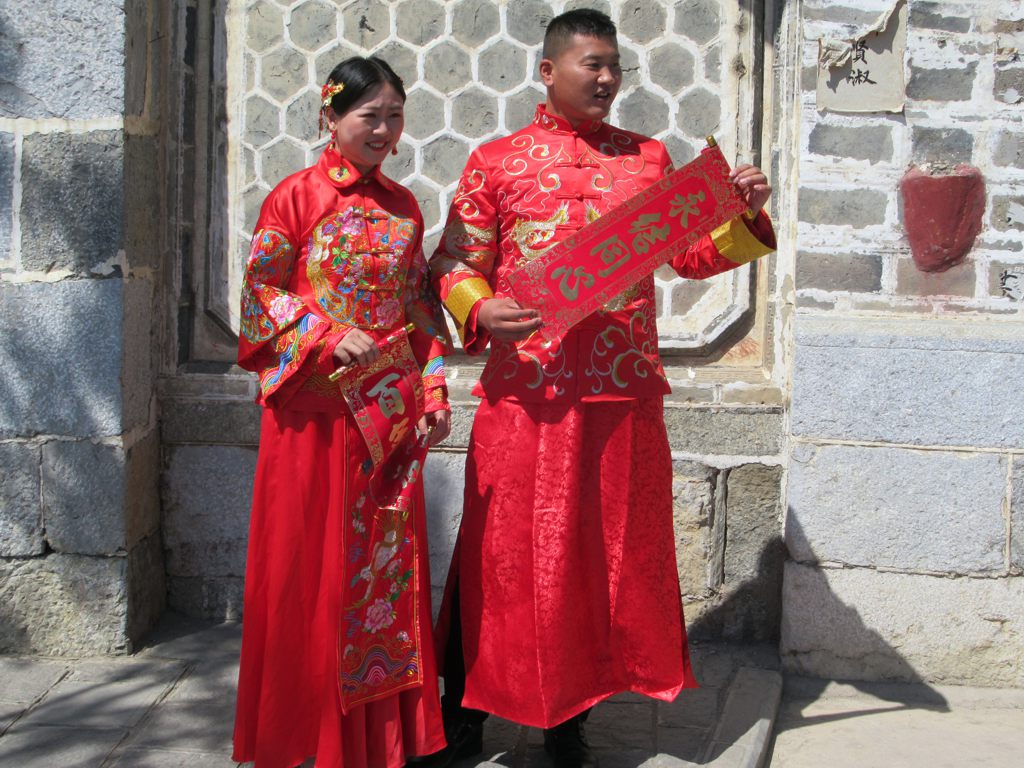
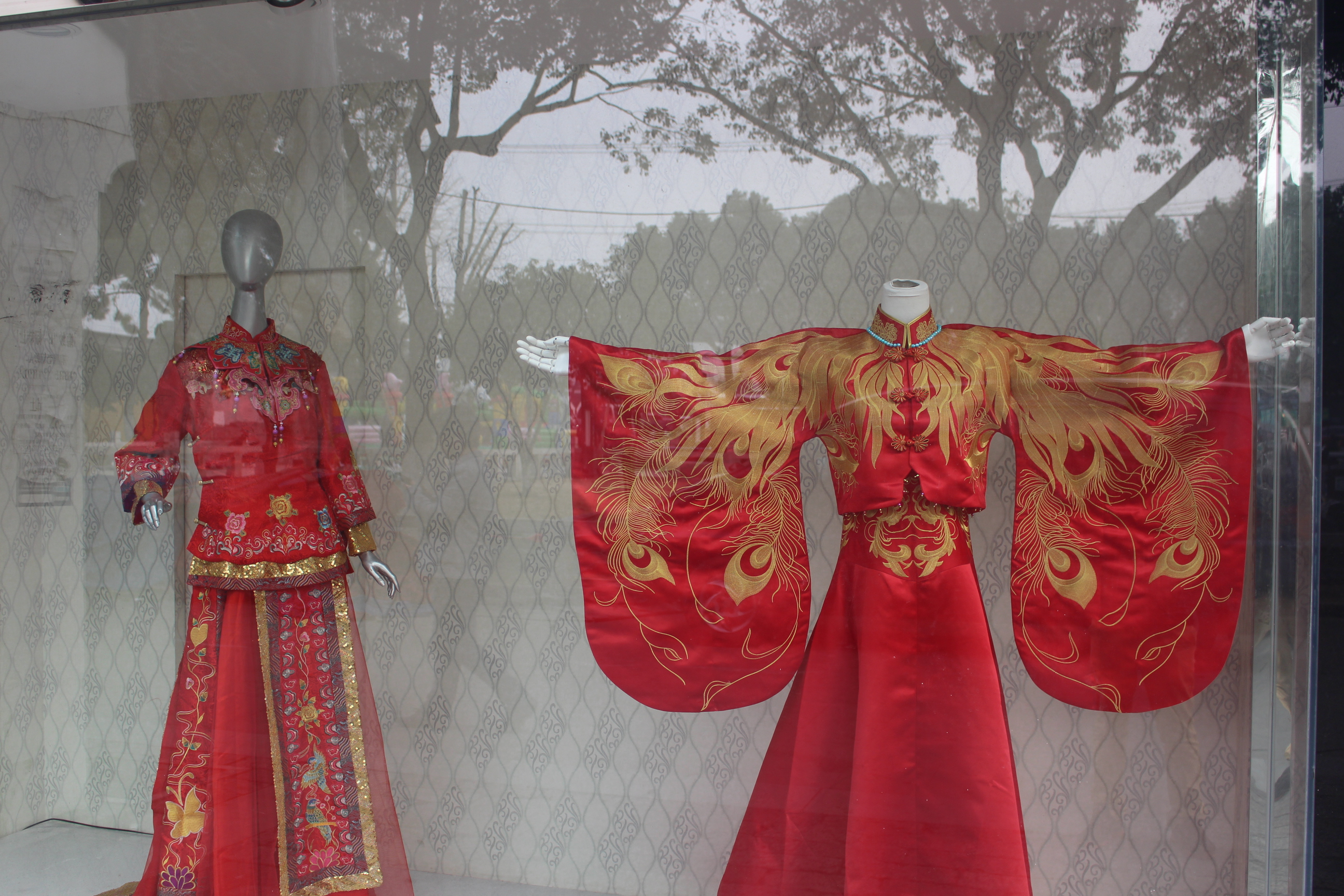
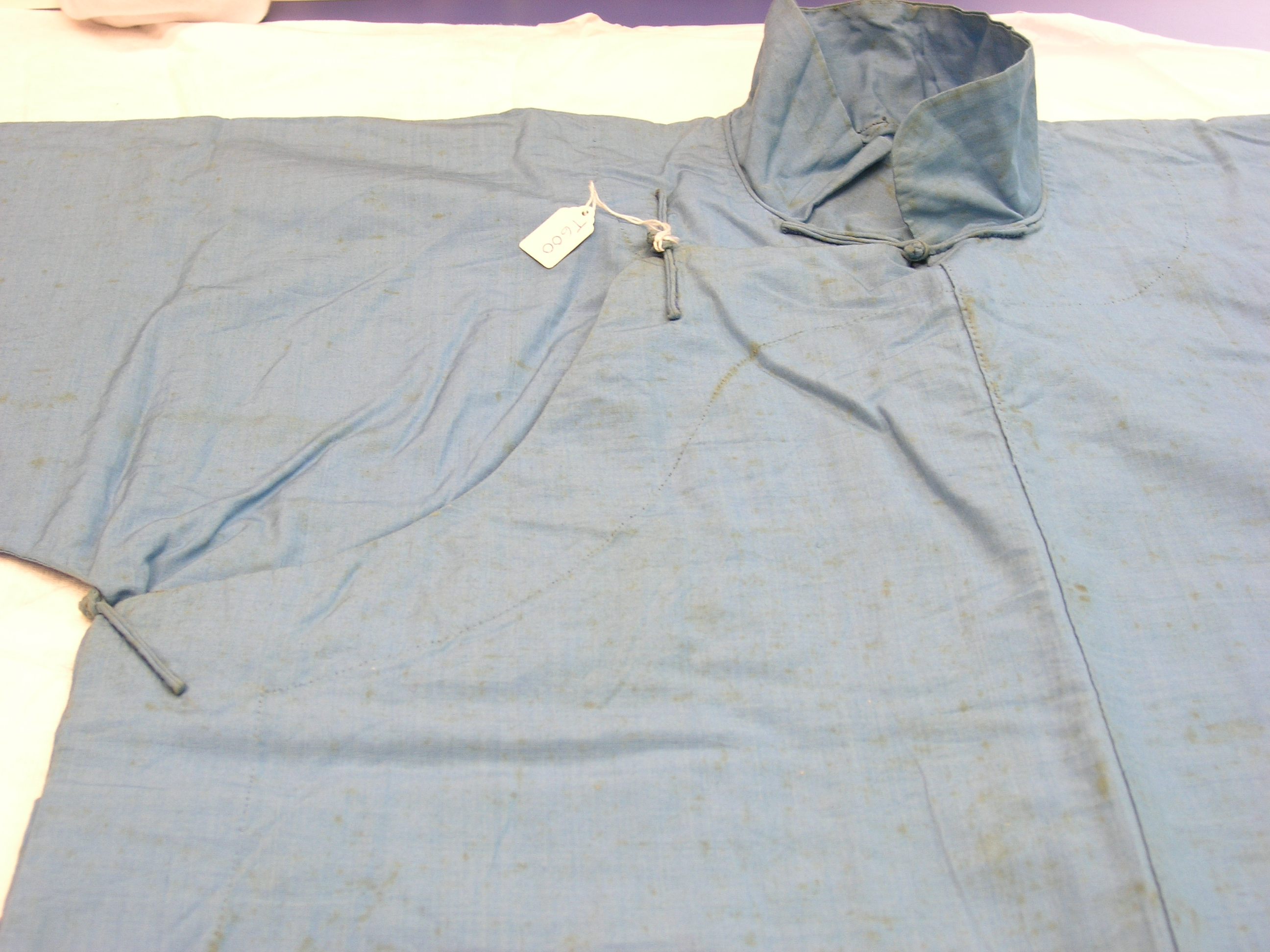

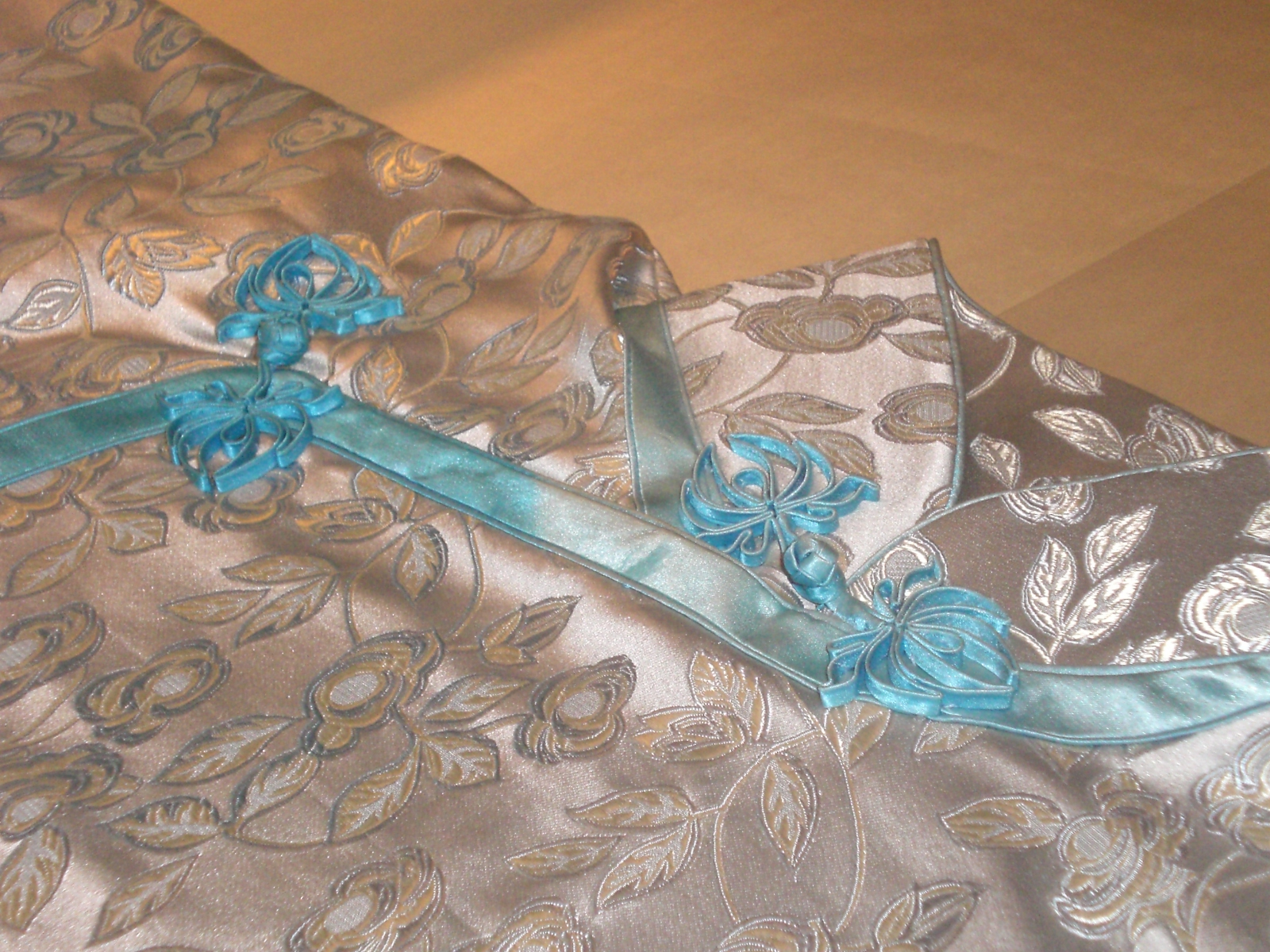
Elaborate form of floral pankou used as a decorative fastener in cheongsam.

Main categories frog
Name	Chinese name	Description
Straight frog	zhípánkòu (直盘扣; 直盤扣); also called zikou (字扣; zìkòu)	The simplest and most common form of frog consisting of a knot of one side and a loop on the other side.
Floral frog	pànhuāpánkòu (襻花盘扣; 襻花盤扣)	A generic term for any forms of frog which are more elaborate than the straight frog.

The floral frog can further be divided into other categories based on shape:

Types of floral frog
Name	Chinese name	Description	Images
Butterfly frog	húdiékòu (蝴蝶扣)	A type of floral frog which is butterfly in shape	
Kumquat frog	pípákòu (琵琶扣)	A type of floral frog which is kumquat-shaped	
Phoenix tail frog		A popular form of frog used on Traditional Chinese wedding dress	

The frog used in the Beijing-style cheongsam are typically handmade by skilled artisans; the process of their making is complex and can take up several days of work. It can typically take up to 26 procedures for the silk to be turned into eligible strips of fabric which can then be turned into the fastening. These procedures include brushing silk four times with a paste to harden it, as well as the cutting of the hardened silk into strips, the stitching of the silk strips before the wiring procedure with copper wire, and the ironing of the silk strips under high temperature as its final stage.

== See also ==
- Button
- Celtic knot
- Austrian knot
