= Facing (sewing) =

Fabric used to finish garment edges

In sewing and tailoring, facing is a small piece of fabric, separate or a part of the garment fabric itself, used to finish the fabric edges. This is distinguished from hemming which simply folds the edge over; facing is (or appears to be) a more substantial layer of additional fabric added to the edges of the garment. The facing adds additional support, strength and prevents stretching. Facing makes a garment look professionally finished with the seams well hidden inside the folds of the facing. Facing is mostly used to finish the edges in necklines, armholes, hems and openings. They are also used widely in all other sewing like quilts and home decor items like curtain hems.

== Types ==
There are basically three types of facing:

1. Shaped facings are cut to match the outside shape of the piece to provide a neat finish, and are often cut from the same pattern pieces. Shaped facings are typically made of the same fabric as the garment, but may also be made of lighter-weight fabric or in a contrasting color as a design element.
2. Extended facings are extensions of the garment fabric, folded back and usually stabilized.
3. Bias facings are strips of lightweight fabric cut on the true bias (US) or cross-grain (UK), and shaped rather than cut to match the edge to which they are applied.

== Makeup ==
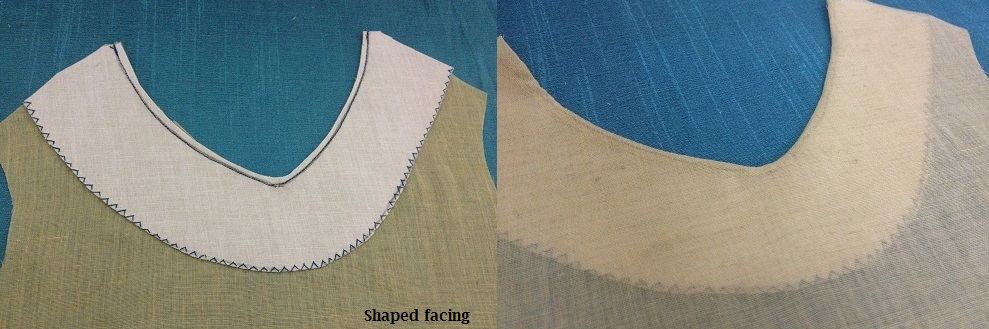
Shaped facing

After sewing the structural seam of a facing, it must also be under-stitched to prevent it rolling to the outside. Under-stitching is done close to the seam line, attaching the facing to the seam allowance. A facing can also be used decoratively by applying it from the inside, allowing it to be turned to the outside as a contrasting piece. An all-in-one facing is used to finish the armhole and neckline of a garment together, all at once.

Interfacing, grading and clipping the seams are all terms closely associated with facing.

Other techniques for finishing an edge include hemming, facing, binded edge and taped edge.

== See also ==
- Embroidery stitch
- Glossary of sewing terminology
- Glossary of textile manufacturing
- List of sewing stitches
- Notions
