= Contrast fabric =

Sewing term

Contrast fabric is a sewing term that refers to a fabric piece or embellishment made from a different fabric than the main fabric. The term 'contrast fabric' is used in contrast to the term self-fabric.

Contrast fabric is used in certain pattern pieces such as facings and linings to produce design details that stand out from the rest of the garment. It is also used as embellishment, such as in ric rac, piping or appliqué. For example, to make buttons a design feature, a special type of button is often covered in the contrasting fabric.
