= Qungua =

Type of Chinese wedding dress

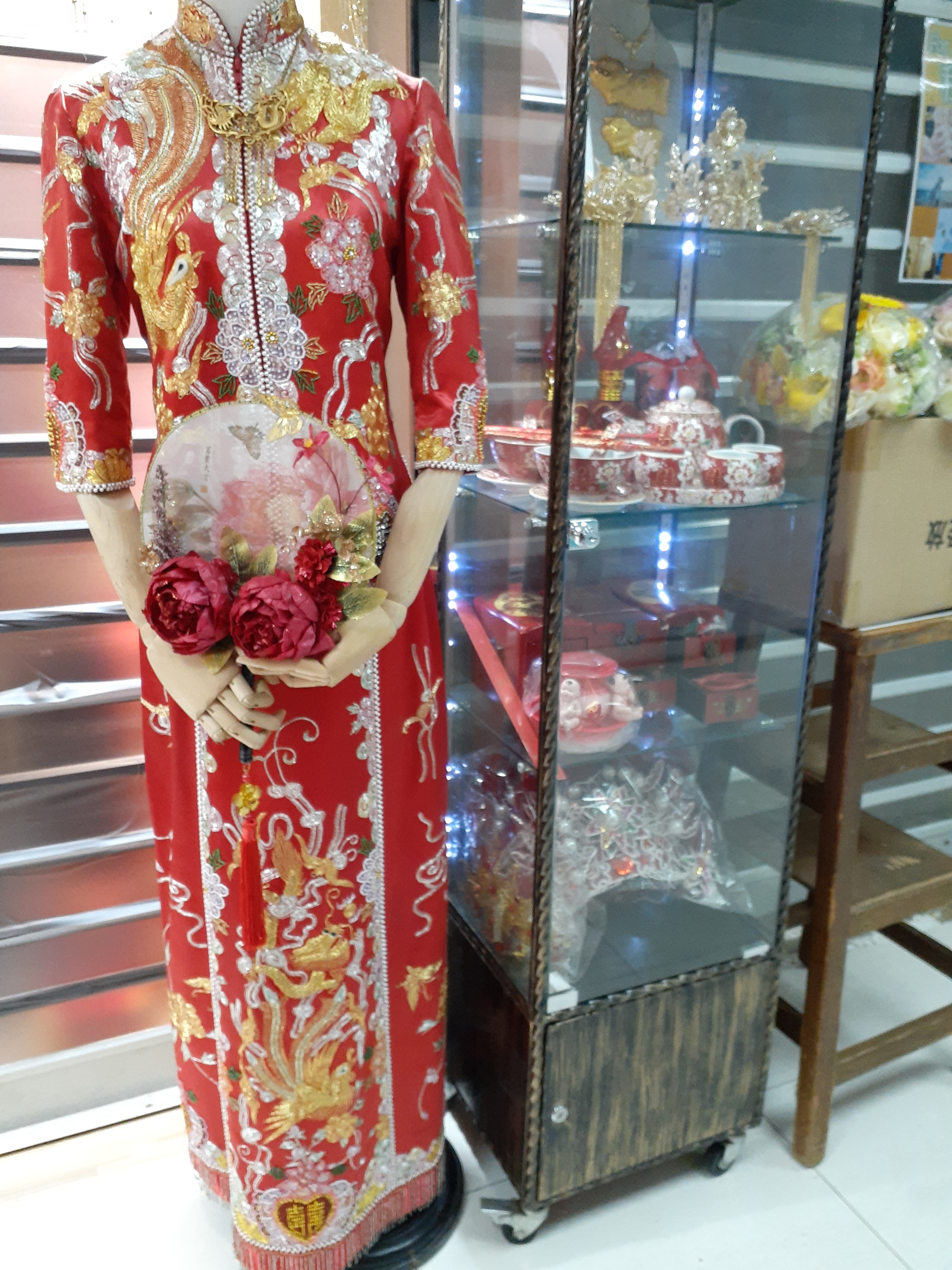
- Qungua in Hong Kong, 2020
- Chinese: 裙褂
- Literal meaning: Skirt jacket
Transcriptions
Standard Mandarin
- Hanyu Pinyin: Qúnguà
- Wade–Giles: Ch'ün2-kwa4
Yue: Cantonese
- Jyutping: Kwan4 gwaa3

Longfenggua
- Traditional Chinese: 龍鳳褂
- Simplified Chinese: 龙凤褂
Transcriptions
Standard Mandarin
- Hanyu Pinyin: Lóngfèngguà
- Wade–Giles: Lung2-feng4-kua4
Yue: Cantonese
- Jyutping: lung4 fung6 gwaa3

Longfeng qungua
- Traditional Chinese: 龍鳳裙褂
- Simplified Chinese: 龙凤裙褂
Transcriptions
Standard Mandarin
- Hanyu Pinyin: Lóngfèng qúnguà
- Wade–Giles: Lung2-feng4-ch'ün2-kua4
Yue: Cantonese
- Jyutping: lung4 fung6 Kwan4 gwaa3

Guaqun
- Chinese: 褂裙
Transcriptions
Standard Mandarin
- Hanyu Pinyin: Guàqún
- Wade–Giles: Kua4-Ch'ün2
Yue: Cantonese
- Jyutping: gwaa3 kwan4

Qungua (Chinese: 裙褂; Jyutping: kwan4 gwaa3), also known as longfenggua (traditional Chinese: 龍鳳褂; simplified Chinese: 龙凤褂), or longfeng qungua (traditional Chinese: 龍鳳裙褂; simplified Chinese: 龙凤裙褂), or guaqun (Chinese: 褂裙; Jyutping: gwaa3 kwan4), is one type of two-piece ceremonial traditional Chinese wedding set of attire, which is composed of a jacket called gua (褂) and of a long Chinese skirt called qun (裙). The qungua is a type of Hanfu worn by Han Chinese brides and originated in the 18th century during the Qing dynasty. It eventually became the traditional wedding attire of Cantonese brides in the Guangdong regions. It is traditionally handmade and is decorated with dragons and phoenixes embroideries. Nowadays, the qungua is still popular as a wedding dress in China, including in Hong Kong and Macau.

== Origins and tradition ==
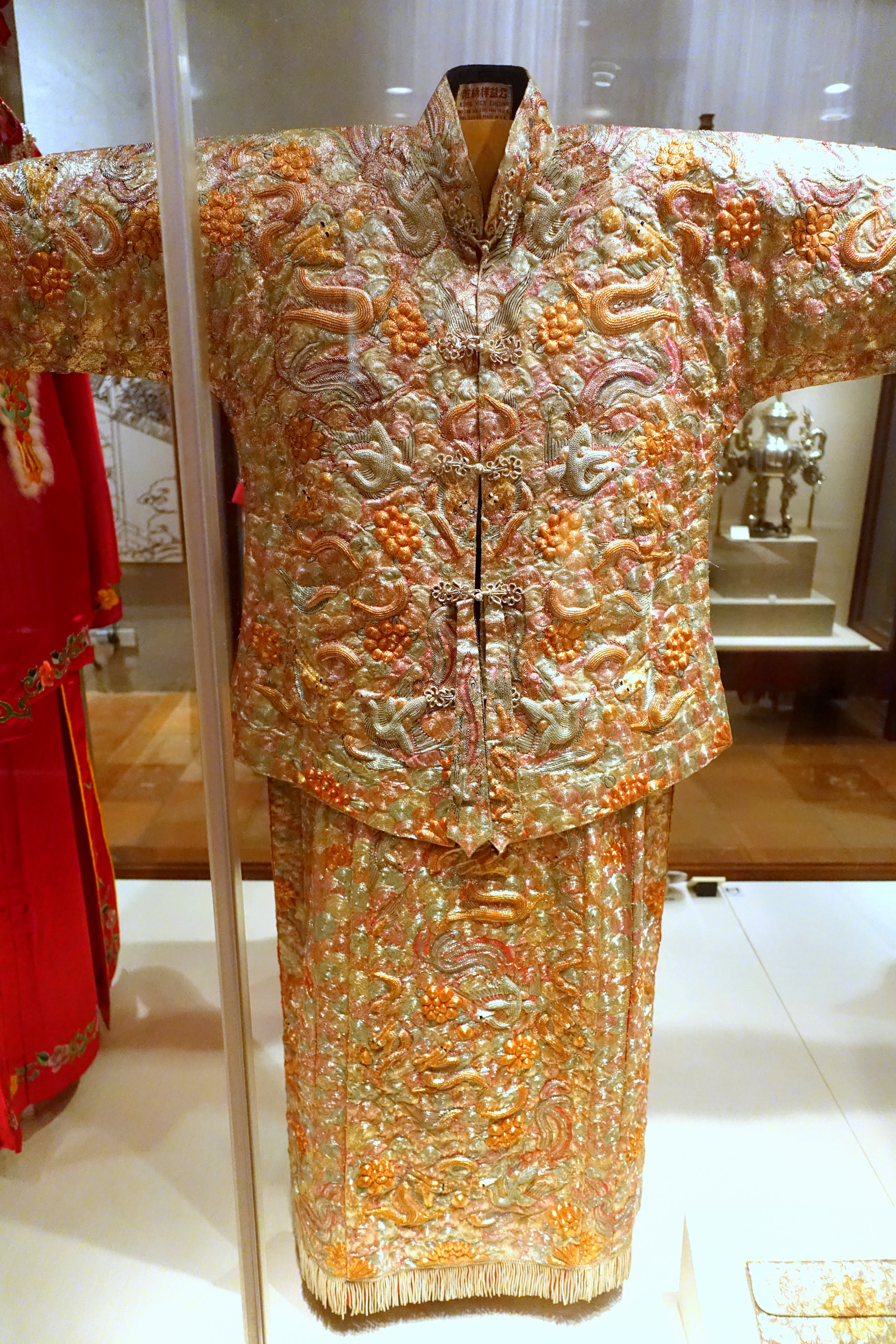
A qungua found in Hong Kong Museum of History.

Back in Ming dynasty, the women wedding dress worn by nobles and commoners was known as fengguan xiapei (traditional Chinese: 鳳冠霞帔; simplified Chinese: 凤冠霞帔) composed of the fengguan and xiapei. The wedding dress worn in Ming dynasty continued to influence the wedding dress of the later centuries.

What is known as qungua only started to be worn in the 18th century during the Qing dynasty. The qungua originated in Guangdong when Liang Zhu, a Guangdong Qing dynasty politician, was rewarded with a silk wedding dress embroidered with dragons and phoenixes by the Qing Emperor at the time of his daughter's wedding. This led to the use qungua in the Guangdong area.

In 18th century, Chinese mothers would start to sew the qungua as soon as a daughter was born in the family. The qungua would then be placed as a part of the daughter's bride dowry when she gets married. The qungua follows the ancient traditional system of shangyi xiachang (Chinese: 上衣下裳; upper and lower garment).

== Construction and Design ==
The qungua is composed of two separate garments: a gua (Chinese: 褂; pinyin: guà; Jyutping: gwaa3; lit. 'coat'), which is a Chinese jacket which closes at the front with buttons, and a qun (Chinese: 裙; pinyin: qún; Jyutping: kwan4; lit. 'skirt'). The qun worn in the qungua is typically straight in cut. The skirt could be pleated.

=== Colour ===
While Western wedding dress tends to be white in colour, Chinese traditional wedding clothing favours the use of red and gold colour.

The gua was originally black in colour while the skirt was originally red in colour.

The gua which is completely red in colour only appeared in the 1960s. Since then the traditional black gua and red qun started to be used for the bride's mother instead of being worn by the brides themselves.

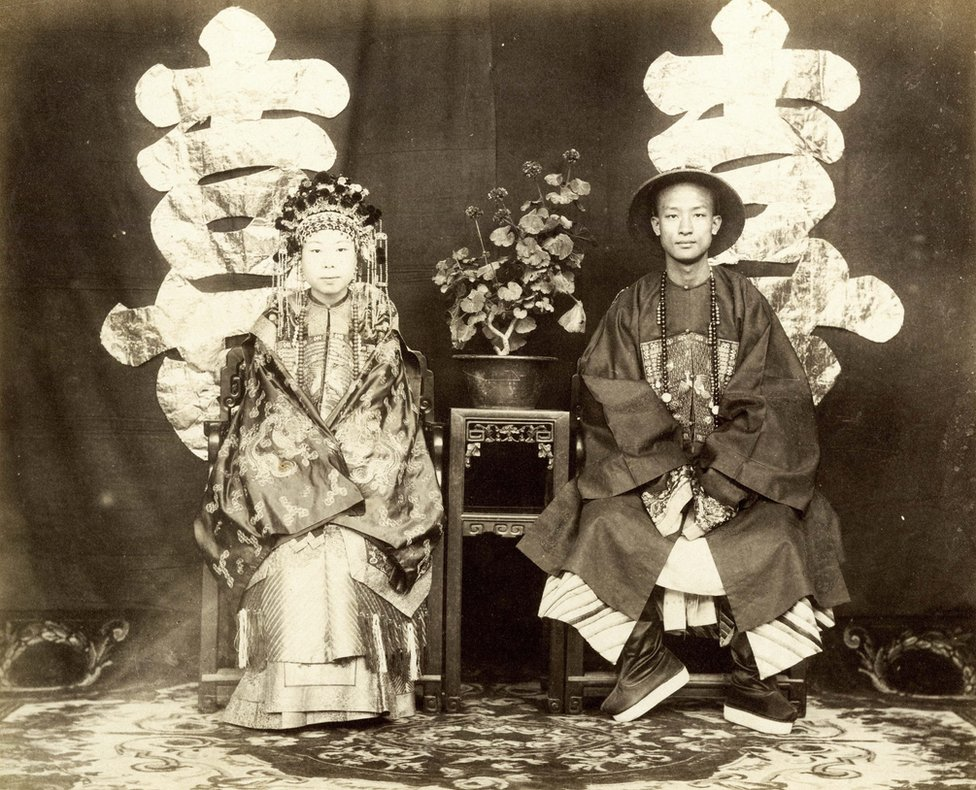
Bride wearing Qing dynasty qungua.

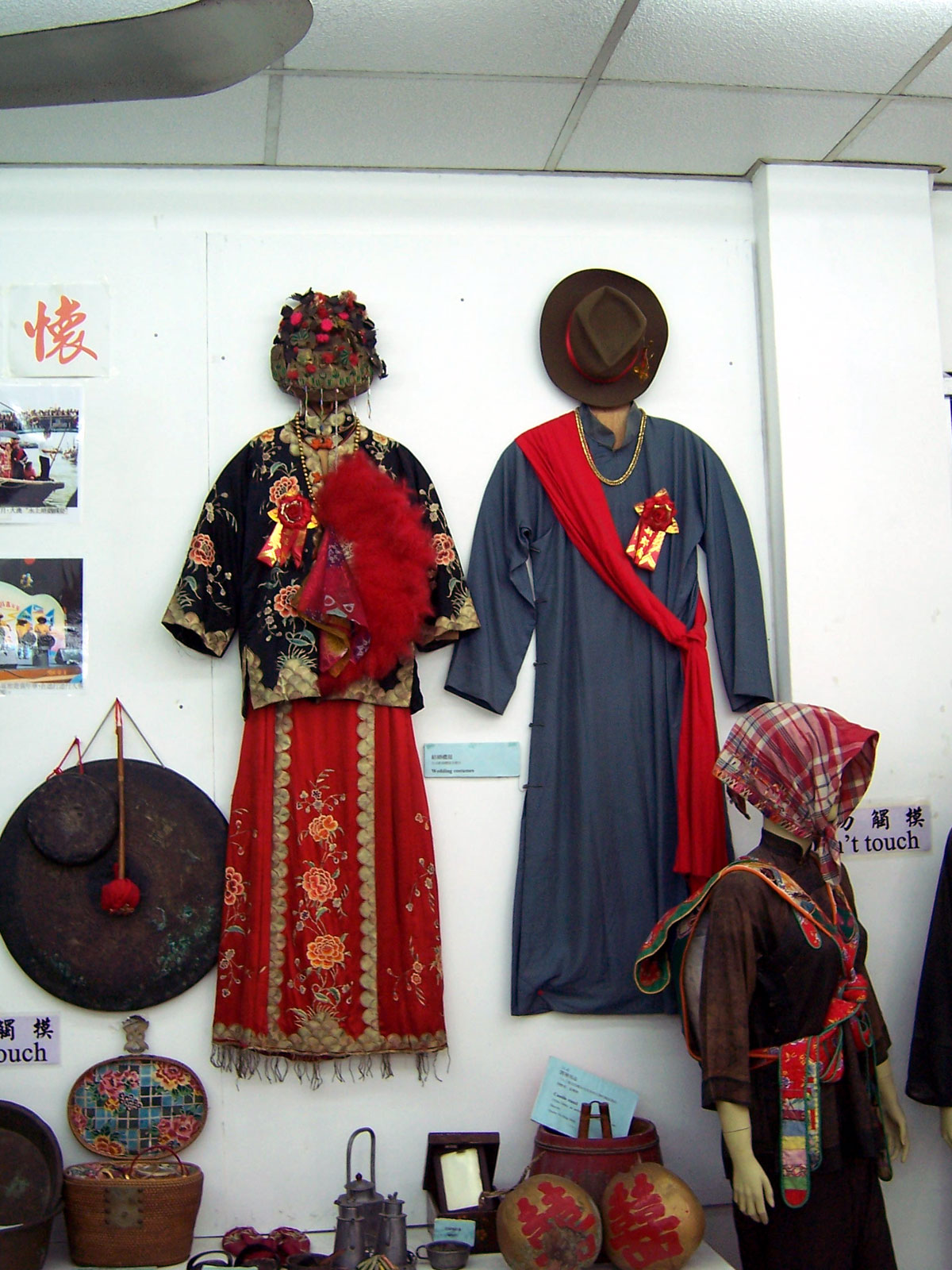
Qungua (left) worn by Chinese brides, 1900s.

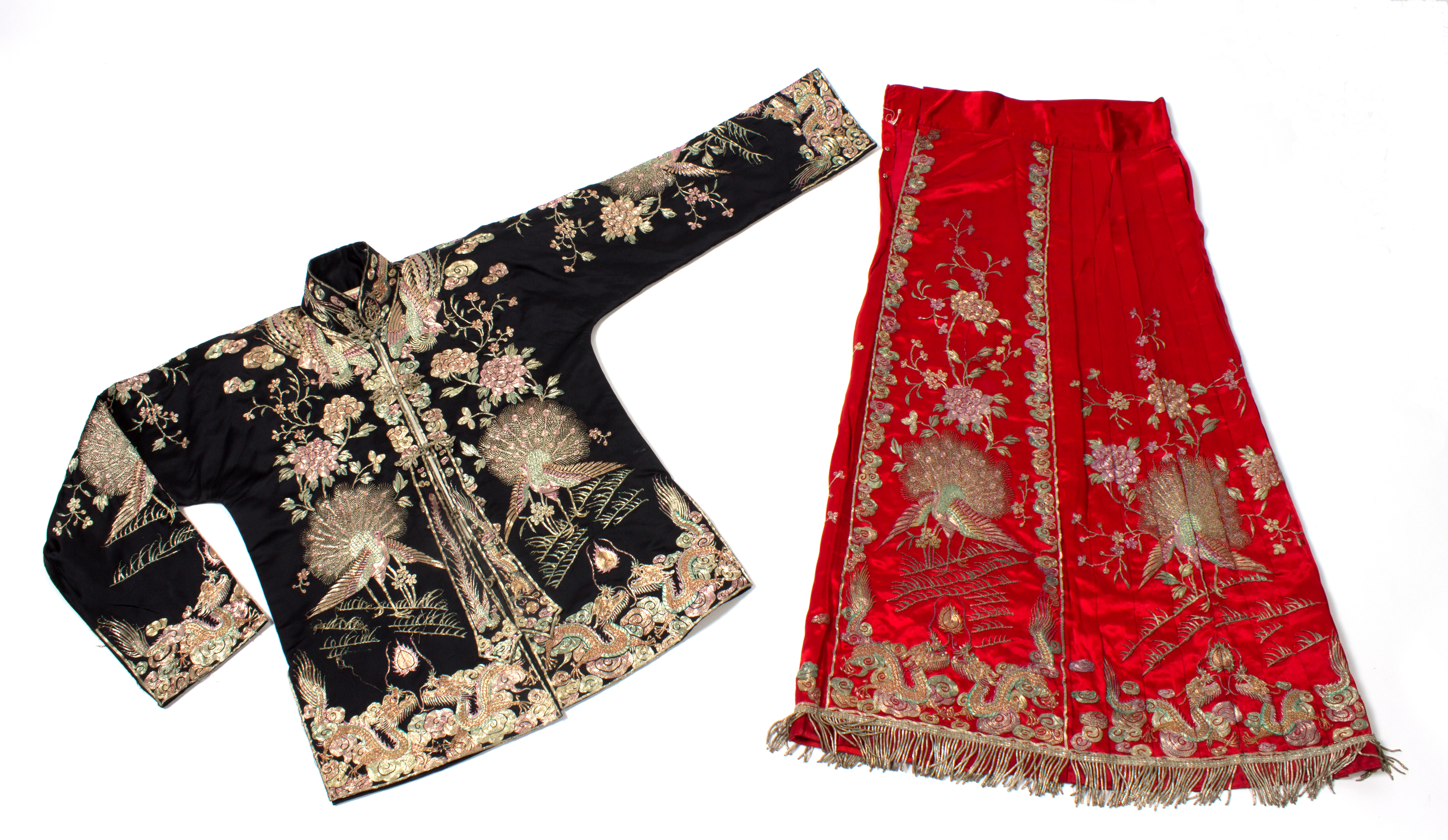
Qungua is a two-piece garment attire: black gua and red qun.

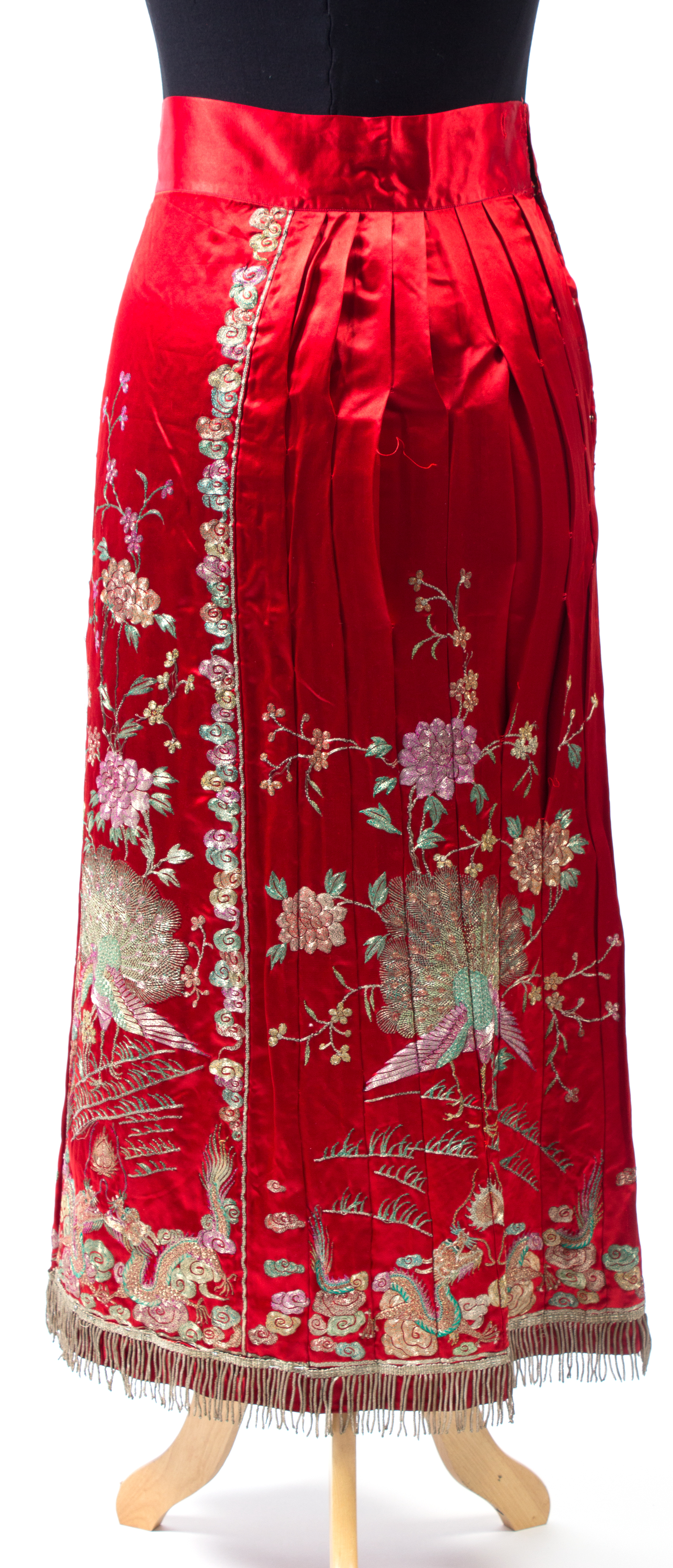
Long skirt qun

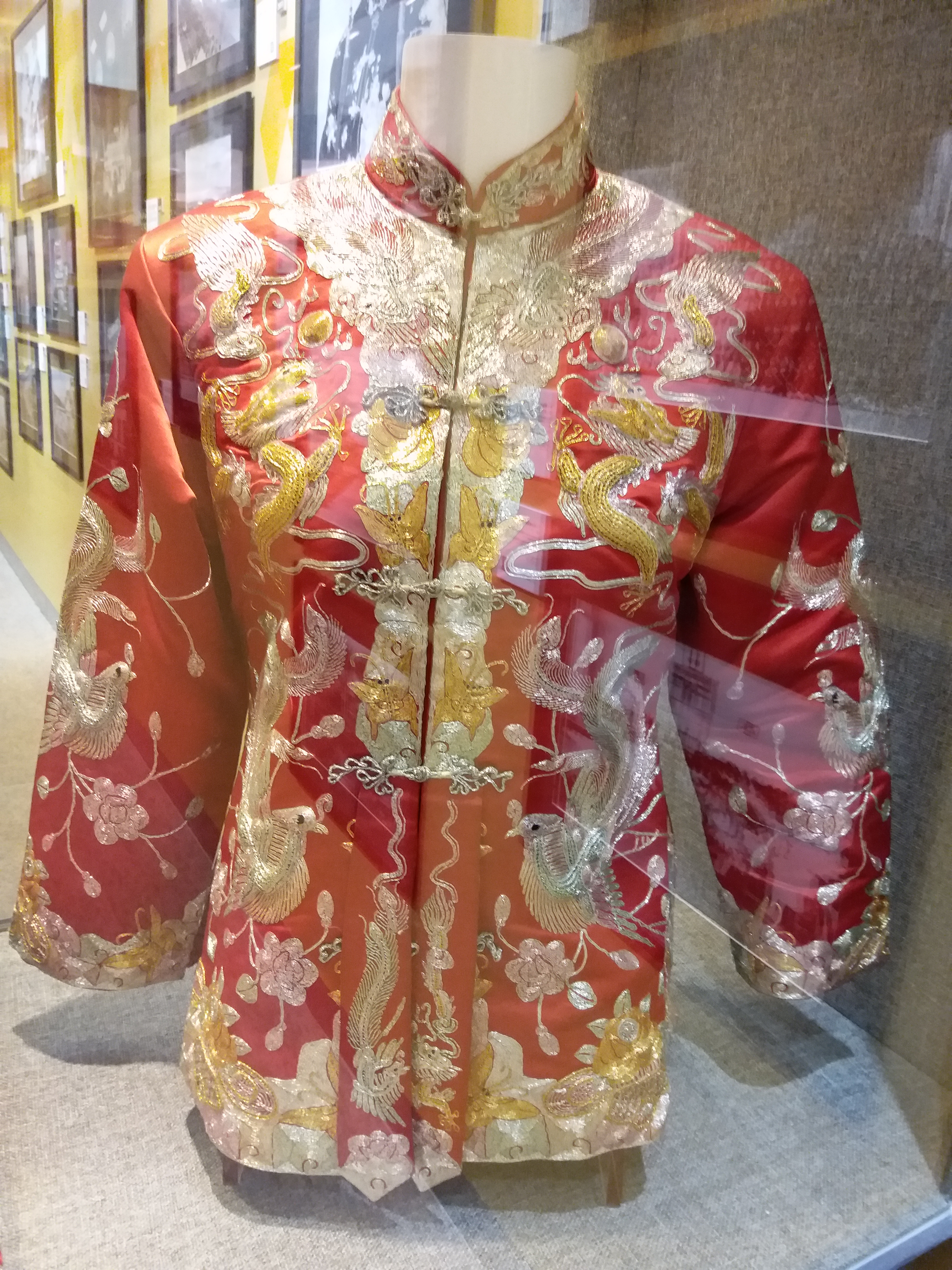
Red gua

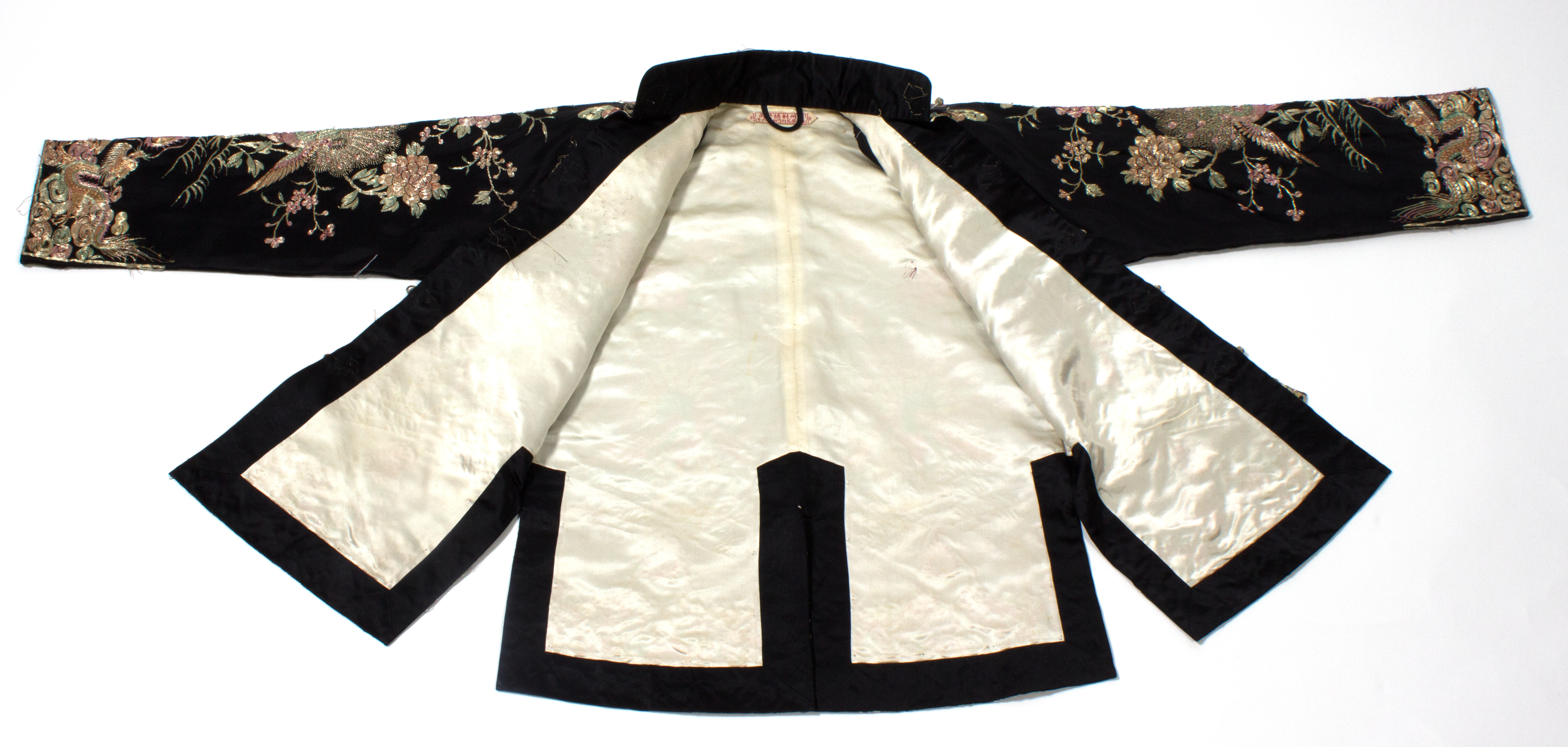
Construction of a black gua jacket.

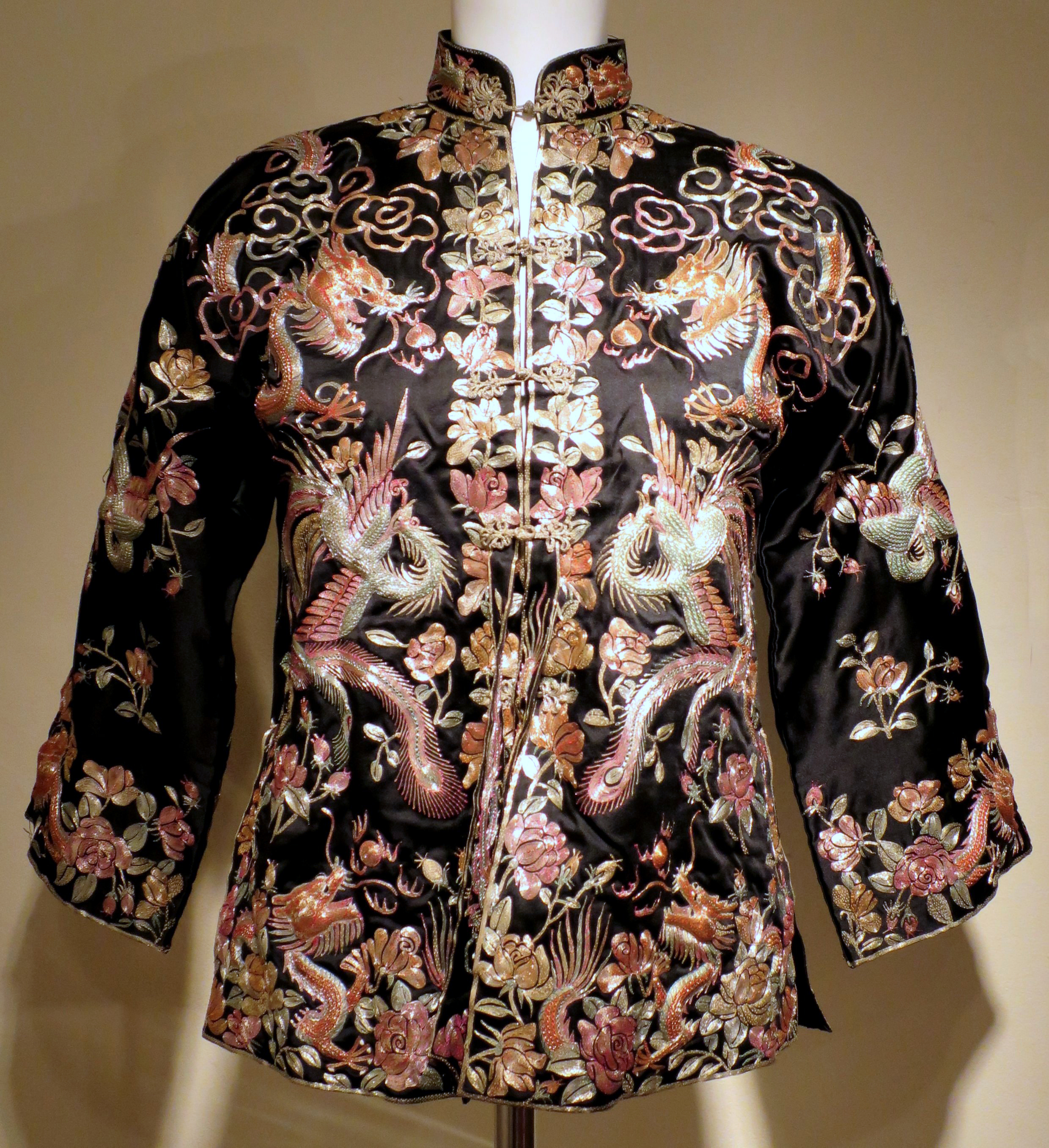
Black gua

=== Embroidery ===
The qungua is typically embroidered with the Chinese dragons called long (traditional Chinese: 龍; simplified Chinese: 龙) and the Chinese phoenix called feng (traditional Chinese: 鳳; simplified Chinese: 凤). It can also be decorated with other auspicious symbols, such as pomegranate (symbolism for fertility), peony flowers, lotus flowers, bats, goldfish, butterfly and birds.

Nowadays, there are 5 different types of qungua which is named accordingly to the percentage of embroidery covering the dress:

1. Xiaowufu (小五福): 30% covered with embroidery,
2. Zhongwufu (中五福): 50% covered with embroidery
3. Dawufu (大五福): 70% covered with embroidery
4. Guahou (褂后): 90% covered with embroidery
5. Guahuang (褂皇): 100% covered with embroidery

== Derivatives and influences ==
=== Betawi Bridal dress ===
The Betawi bridal dress, partly influenced by Chinese culture and by Indonesian culture, looks similar to the Chinese qungua. Like the qungua, the Betawi bridal dress is a two-piece set of attire which composed of an ankle-length with wider bottom skirt called kun and an upper garment called tuaki. The tuaki is decorated with Chinese auspicious symbols. One difference from the qungua is the use of Betawi Lotus, also known as Betawi pomegranate, a separate ornamental garment which covers the chest and shoulder areas (similar to the yunjian of the Chinese people). The Betawi lotus was used to denote the origins of the Betawi bride, but it was eventually replaced by beads which typically follows the Spanish cherry floral pattern. The kun and tuaki must match in colour.

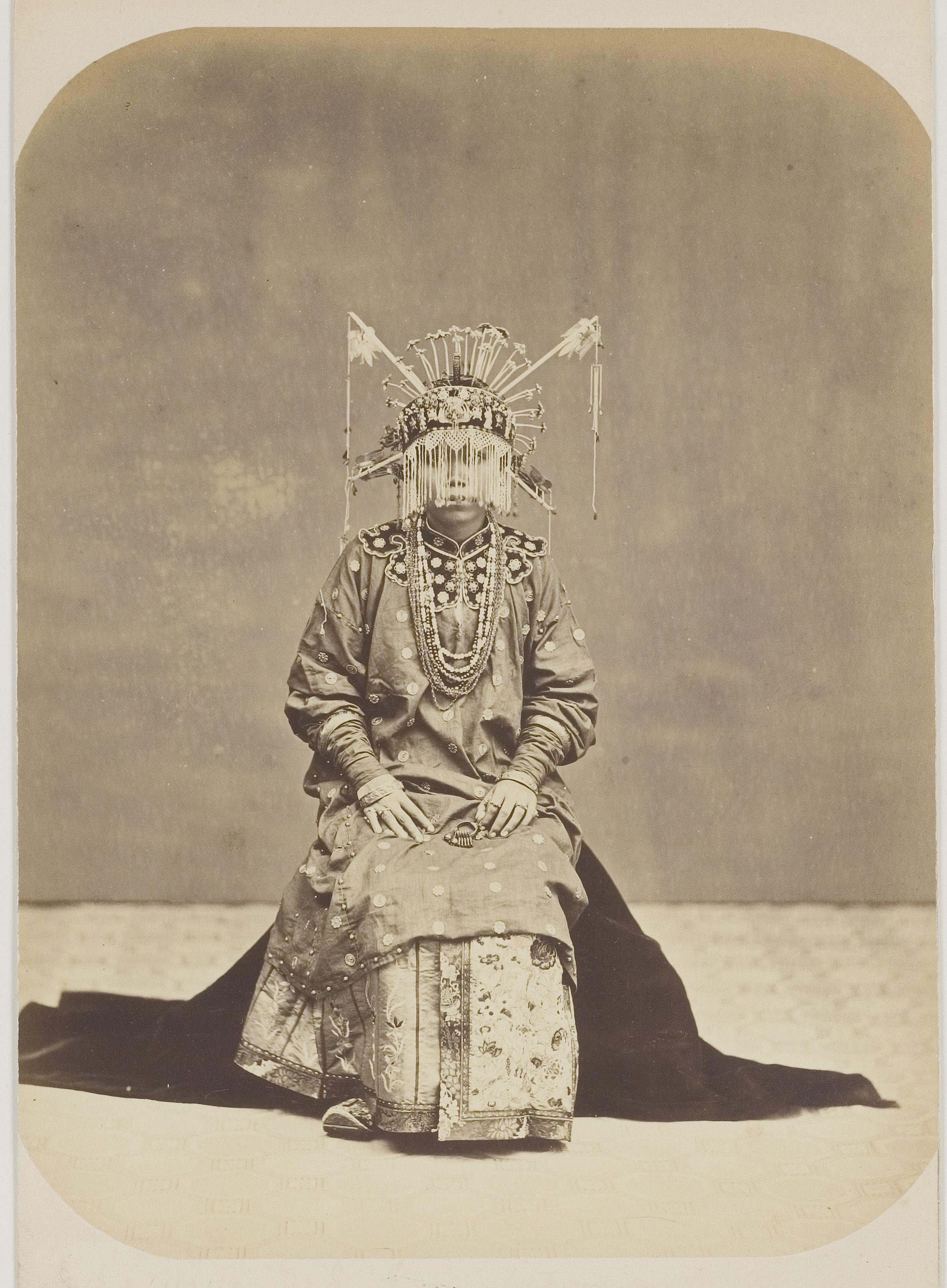
Chinese Bride in Batavia in her wedding dress, 1870. The dress is heavily influenced by Chinese culture but also shows subtle differences.

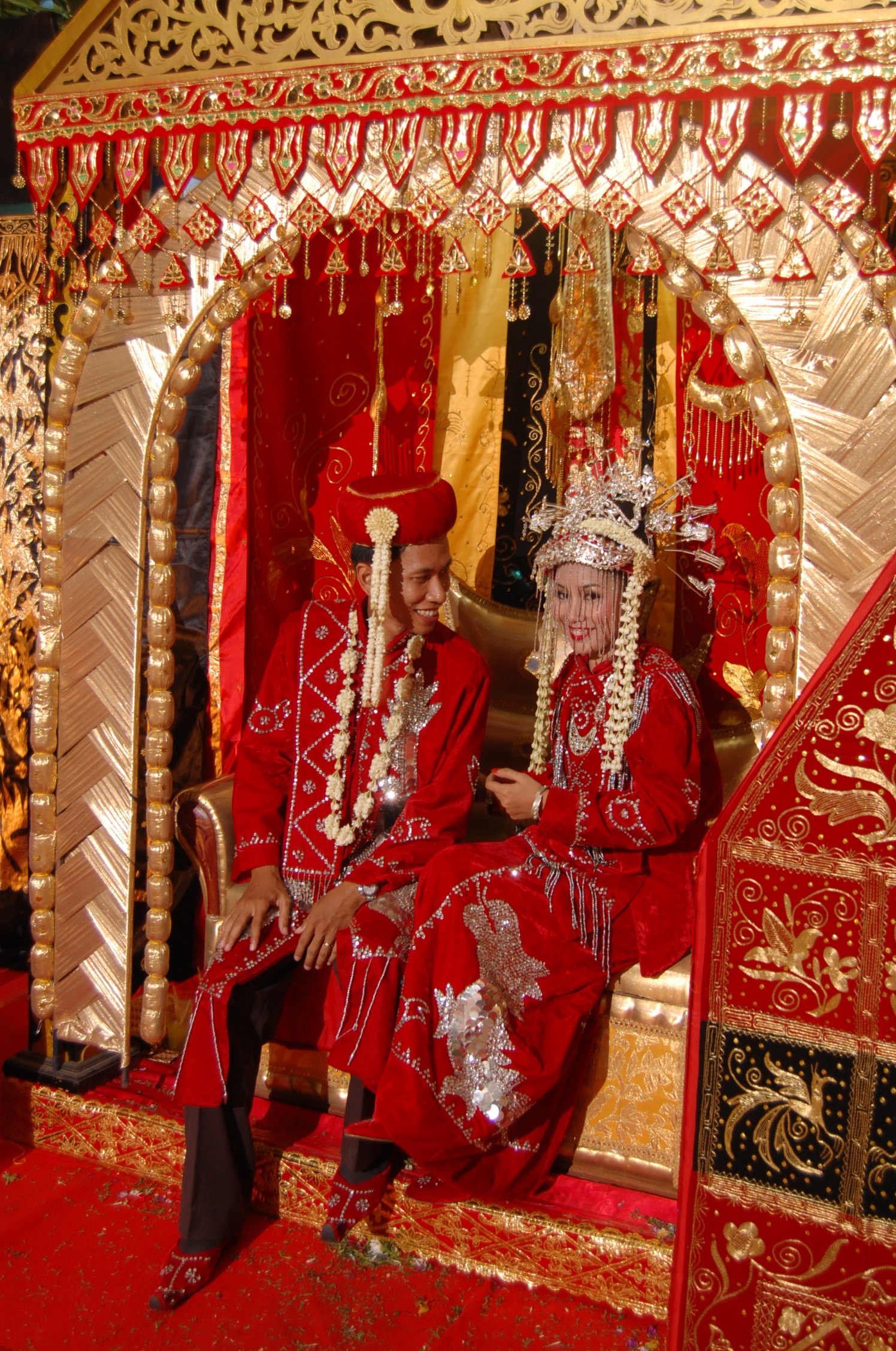
Betawi bride and groom, 2008.

== Differences with other garments ==
=== Fengguan xiapei ===
The qungua is different from the fengguan xiapei (traditional Chinese: 鳳冠霞帔; simplified Chinese: 凤冠霞帔), another type of Traditional Han Chinese wedding set of attire, which was worn in Ming and Qing dynasties in terms of composition of garments and accessories which the qungua lacks of. The fengguan xiapei is a set of attire which was composed of red mang ao (traditional Chinese: 蟒襖; simplified Chinese: 蟒袄; lit. 'python jacket'), which is a type of Ming dynasty-style round-collar robe decorated with dragons, which was worn by Han Chinese women as a court robe; a xiapei (Chinese: 霞帔), which is a type of long scarf in Ming and a type of stole in Qing dynasty; a mangchu (Chinese: 蟒裙; lit. 'Python skirt'), which is a skirt which can be red or green and is embroidered with dragons and phoenixes on the front and back skirt lapels), and the fengguan, the phoenix coronet. The Wedding attire is sometimes decorated with Chinese cloud collar known as yunjian.

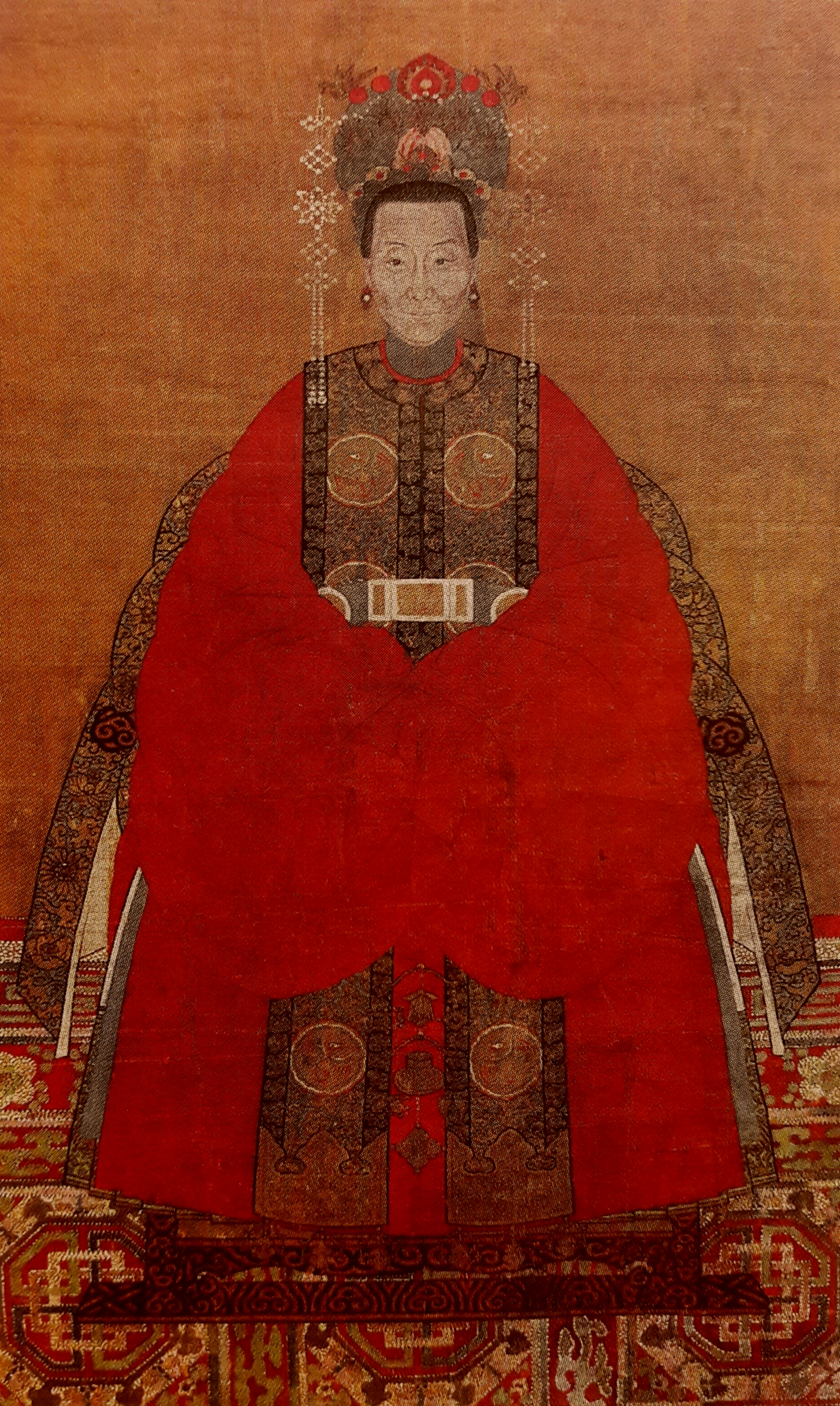
Portrait of lady in fengguan xiapei in Qing dynasty,

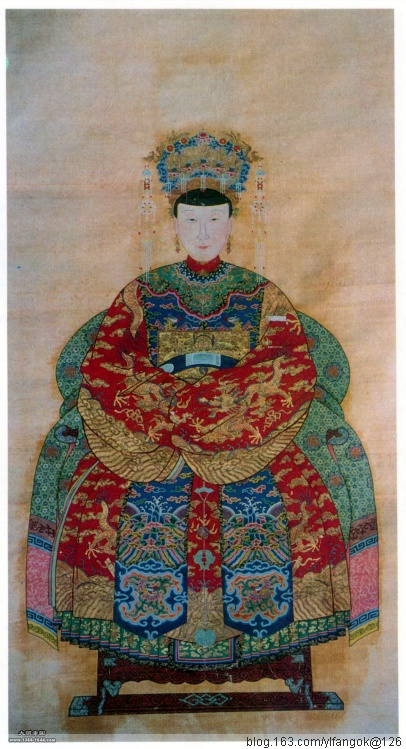
Qing dynasty fengguan xiapei (凤冠霞帔), a yunjian is on top of the attire.

=== Xiuhefu ===
The qungua is distinct from another Chinese wedding set of attire called Xiuhefu (Chinese: 秀禾服). The Xiuhefu typically has an overlapping jacket which closes to the right side (instead of the qungua central closing jacket) which is worn with an A-line skirt (qun) which looks similar to a mamianqun instead of a straight cut skirt. The Xiuhefu is typically embroidered with flowers and birds to symbolize love for whole seasons.

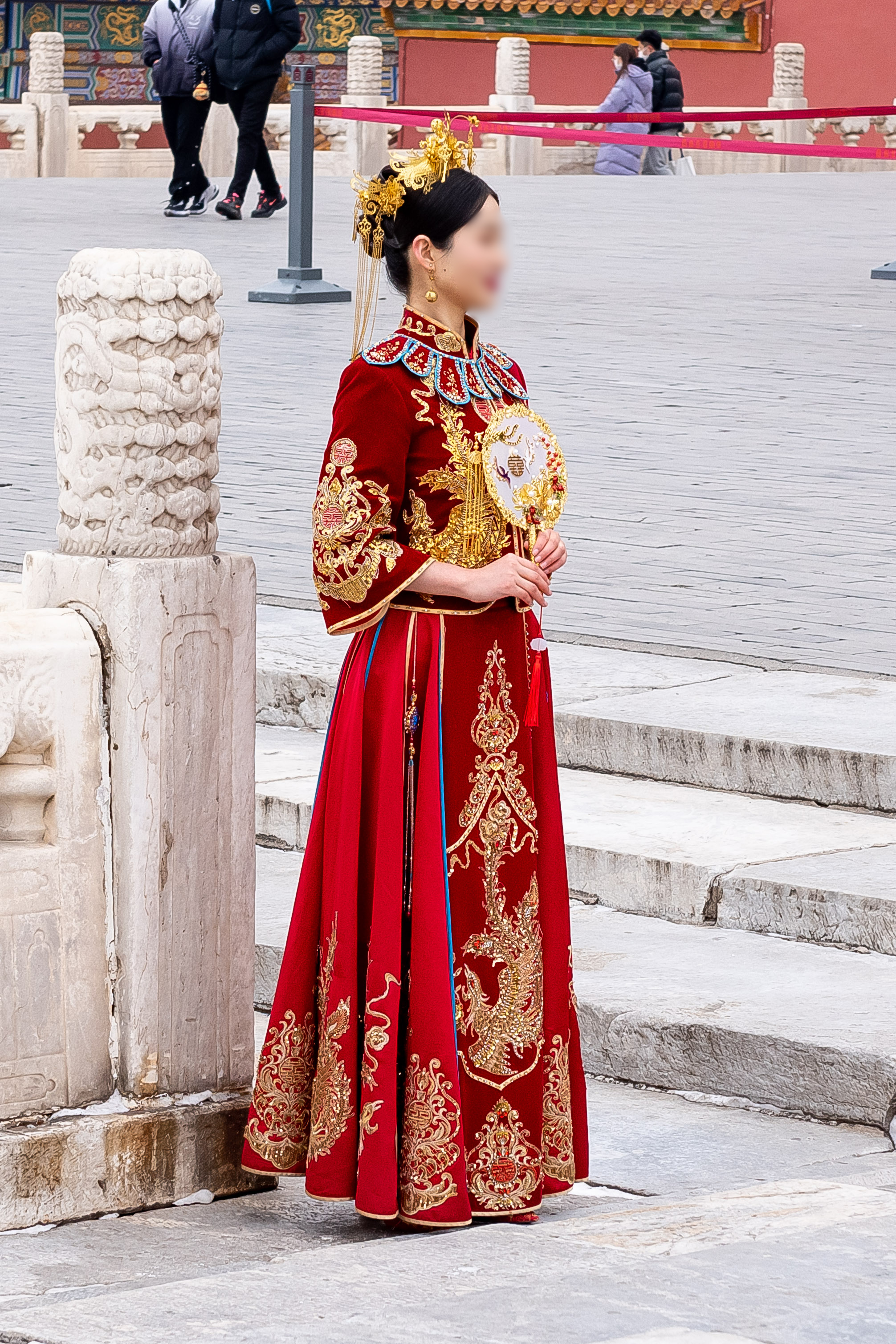
A bride in Xiuhefu between Taihedian and Zhonghedian, 2022

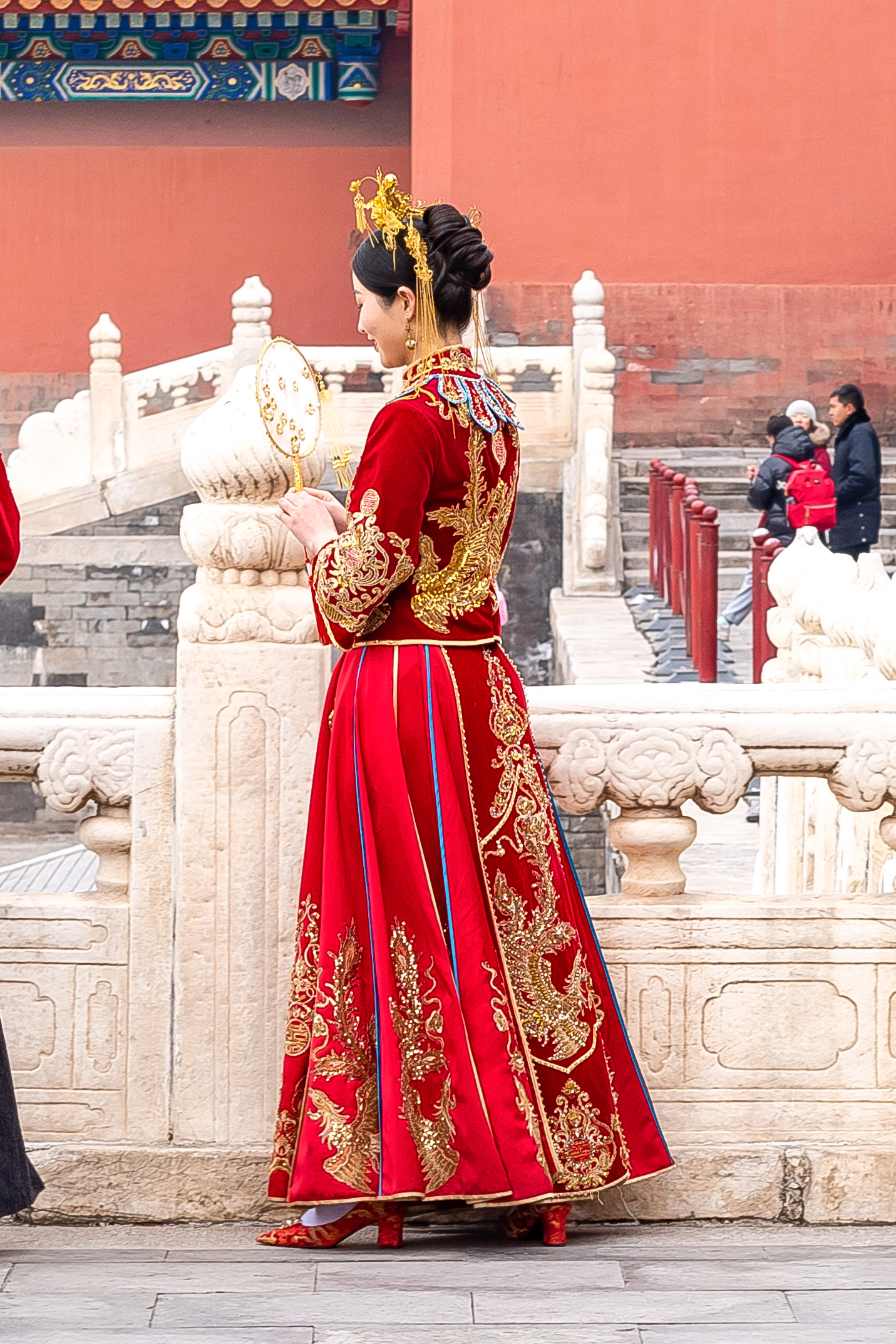
A bride in Xiuhefu near Xiehemen, 2022

=== Cheongsam ===
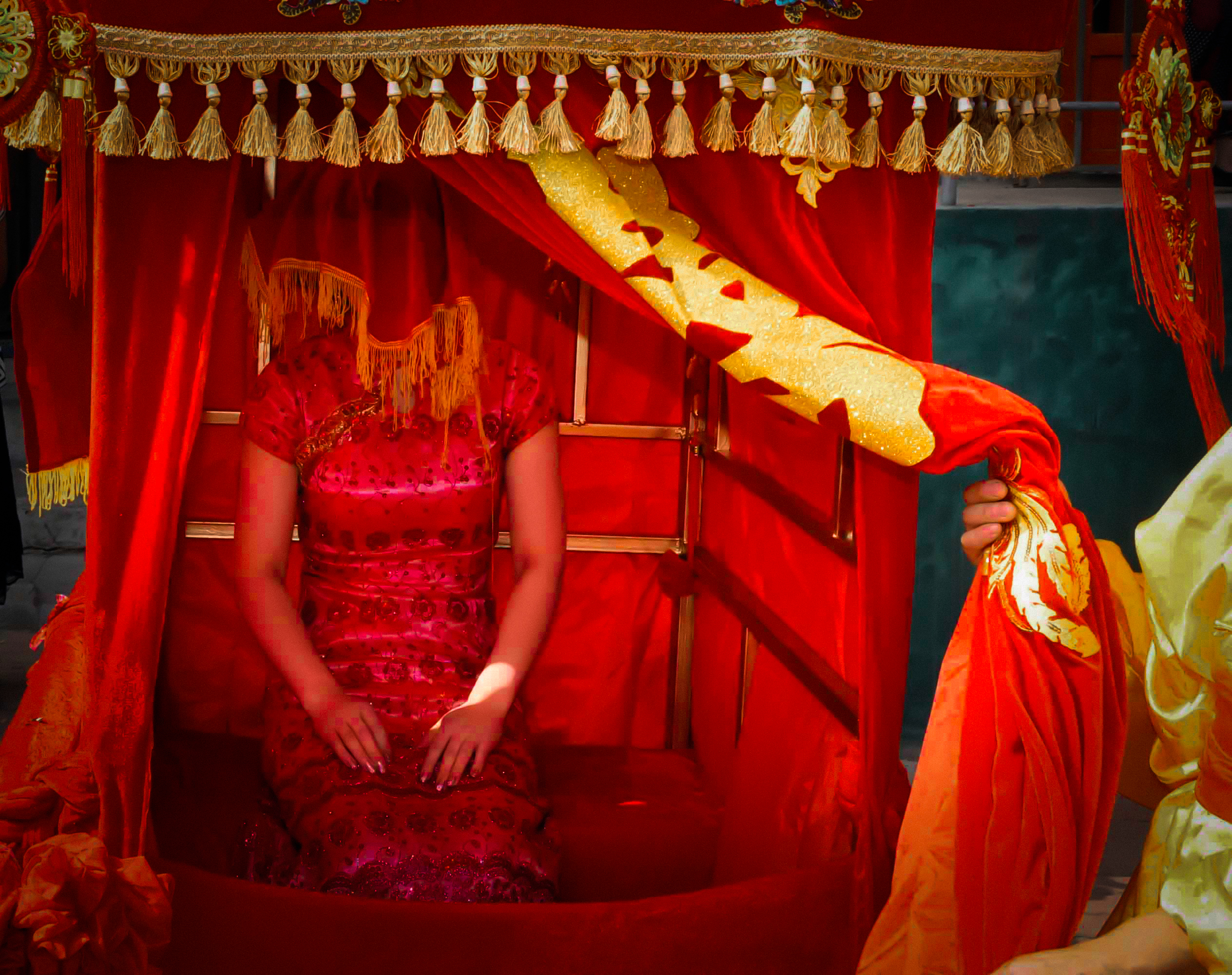
Chinese bride wearing cheongsam with a honggaitou covering her face for wedding ceremony.

The qungua is different from the cheongsam which can also be worn as a Traditional Chinese wedding dress. The qungua is a two-piece garment composed of jacket and skirts while the modern cheongsam is currently a one-piece robe. Prior to the 1930s and the 1940s, the cheongsam was also a two-piece set of garment which was composed of a long robe and was worn with a pair of trousers.

== See also ==
- Traditional Chinese wedding dress
- Fengguan
- Hanfu
- Ruqun
- Traditional Chinese marriage
