= Self-fabric =

Self-fabric, in sewing, is a fabric piece or embellishment made from the same fabric as the main fabric, as opposed to contrast fabric.

Self-fabric is used for some pattern pieces such as facings and linings to produce clean garment lines and help the fabric piece blend in with the rest of the garment. Fabric-covered buttons and the welts of a bound buttonhole can be created using self-fabric to minimize their visibility.

Self-fabric can also be used to make design details stand out. For example, a patch pocket on a coat could be made of contrasting fabric, but feature an appliqué made from self-fabric on the pocket. A very common use of self-fabric as an embellishment is when two garments that are to be worn together out of different fabrics and use self-fabric from one garment as a trim on the other (such as piping).
