= Chinese auspicious ornaments in textile and clothing =

Chinese auspicious ornaments in textile and clothing refers to any form of Chinese auspicious ornaments, which are used to decorate various forms of Chinese textile and clothing (including Hanfu and Qizhuang), fashion accessories, and footwear in China since the ancient times. Chinese auspicious ornaments form part of Chinese culture and hold symbolic meanings. In ancient China, auspicious ornaments were often either embroidered or woven into textile and clothing. They are also used on religious and ritual clothing (e.g. Daojiao fushi which is Taoist clothing and Chinese Buddhist clothing) and in Xifu, Chinese opera costumes. Auspicious symbols and motifs continue to be used in present-day China in industries, such as home textiles and clothing; they are also used in modern design packaging and interior design. Some of these Chinese auspicious ornaments were also adopted by European countries during the era of Chinoiserie, where they became decorative patterns on fashionable chinoiserie fashion and textiles.

== Cultural significance ==
Chinese auspicious patterns and motifs have profound meanings and are rich in forms; these reflect the desires and yearning of the ancient Chinese to pursue a better life. Chinese auspicious ornaments are typically decorations of Chinese cultural origins which are rooted in Confucianism, Taoism, Chinese Buddhism beliefs, in Chinese mythology and cosmology and concepts, as well from Buddhist visual arts and from the natural flora and fauna in China. Throughout Chinese history, the use of Chinese embroideries on textile, clothing, and footwear also reflected and expressed the subtle changes in aesthetic concepts, cultural traditions, ethics and morals of the Chinese people throughout the millennia.

== Usage ==
=== Common items ===
Chinese auspicious symbols and patterns were used on wedding bedding textiles. They were also used to decorate Chinese fragrant sachet (e.g. Qingyang sachet) and Chinese purses (hebao).

=== Garments and clothing accessories ===
Clothing and colour in China also played an important role in representing its wearer's identity, rank, and culture. Clothing which were decorated with Chinese dragons and cosmological symbols, rank badges were typically symbol of status of the ruling class in ancient China.

List of garment and foot wear items decorated with Chinese auspicious ornaments
Court dress attire	Religious attire	Wedding attire	Common fashion accessories and garments	Footwear
Diyi (Note: Diyi is also known as huiyi. It was decorated with gold pheasants, clouds, and dragons. It was worn along with the fengguan); Mianfu; Mandarin square found bufu, including the yuanlingshan, surcoats (gua); Dragon robes and python robes	Daojiao fushi (Taoist clothing)	Qungua; Xiuhefu; Mangao and mangchu (Note: a form of aoqun; mangchu was either a red or green coloured skirt embroidered with dragons and phoenix which was first worn on wedding day.); Fengguang xiapei	Baijiayi; Dudou; Yunjian; Xiapei	Tiger-head shoes; Xiuhuaxie

== Auspicious set of ornaments ==
=== Twelve ornaments ===
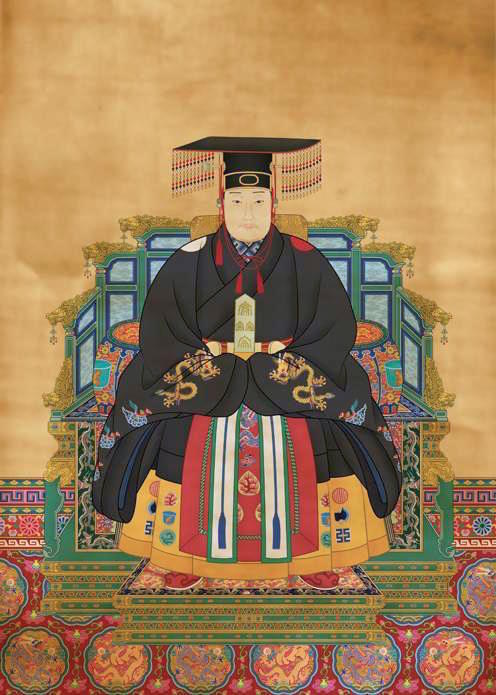
Emperor wearing mianfu decorated with the Twelve ornaments, Ming dynasty

The Twelve ornaments are one of the oldest motifs in China. They originated in the Western Zhou dynasty and was a group of highly auspicious ancient Chinese symbols and designs, signifying authority and power. They were typically embroidered on imperial clothing, and were used as decoration on textile fabrics.

Their use on clothing have been recorded in the Shangshu Yiji; since then, they have continuously been used. The system of clothing patterns was however established in the Han dynasty, where the types and the number of ornaments was regulated based on a person's ranks. In the Sui dynasty, the twelve ornaments were reserved for the Emperor exclusively; Emperor Yang Sui established a system which defined the exact location of these ornaments on the imperial robes. (Note: Emperor Yang Sui established that the sun and moon motif must be on each shoulder, while the starts must be found on the back.) This system continued in the Ming dynasty. (Note: The Twelve Ornaments were used on the Emperor's dragon robe and the mianfu) The system was changed in the Qing dynasty when the Manchu established their own clothing system. (Note: The Twelve Ornaments were also reintroduced on court and imperial clothing in 1759; See page Qizhuang for more details.) The emperor wore all twelve ornaments on his clothing.

Twelve ornaments
Name	Symbolism	Description	images
Sun (日, rì)	Source of life	Sun with the sanzuwu (Three-legged crow) inside it.	
Moon (月, yuè)	Heaven	Moon with a moon rabbit inside	
Three stars (星辰, xīngchén)	Cosmic universe as personified by the Emperor, it is an unending source of pardon and love		
Mountains (山, shān)	The emperor's ability to rule earth and water, symbolizing stability and tranquility		
Chinese dragon (龍, lóng)	Adaptability and strength		
Pheasant (華蟲, huá chóng)	Peace and refinement.	A colourful pheasant	
Two cups (宗彝, zōng yí)	Imperial loyalty, also symbolizes the virtue of filial piety	A pair of sacrificial goblets used in ancient sacrifice; one of the cups is decorated with the motif of a monkey (symbolizes wisdom and cleverness) while the other is decorated with the motif of a tiger (symbolizes authority, courage, and bold spirit).	
Zao (藻, zǎo)	symbol of the emperor's leadership, represents brightness and purity (noble and pure conduct)	A spray of pondweed.	
Fire (火, huǒ)	Represents the emperors' intellectual brilliance; also symbolizes summer solstice	Upward pattern of a fire emblem, symbolized that the emperor led its people in making positive efforts	
Grain of rice (粉米, fěn mǐ)	Symbolize nourishment and the country's agriculture, and also symbolizes that the emperor is the mainstay for the people.		
Axe (黼, fǔ)	The Axe stands for "cut-off"; i.e. the emperor's power to act decisively		
Figure 亞 (黻, fú)	Represents collaboration and the power of the emperor to make a clear distinction between right and wrong	It is a bow-shaped sign	

=== Bagua ===
Bagua are also used to decorate clothing and textiles, including in Xifu. Bagua are believed to be derived from the markings on the back of a tortoise shell after it had been placed on sacrificial fire.

=== Yin and Yang ===
Yin and yang are also used to decorate clothing, including Xifu and headwear.

=== Eight treasures ===
The Eight treasures (八宝 bābǎo) can appear on clothing and textile. These motifs were typically used by Confucianists.

Type	Symbolism	Images
Pearl (寳珠, bǎozhū), or flaming pearl (Note: It became a flaming jewel in the mid-Qing dynasty)	Wealth and success. The pearl regularly appears on textiles and rank badge. By the mid-Qing dynasty, the pearl evolved into the flaming pearl, which represents the sun, wisdom, power, and an imperial treasure.	
Double lozenges (方勝, "fāngshèng")	Happiness in marriage and counteracts maleficent influences.	
Stone chime (磬, "qìng")	A just and upright life.	
rhinoceros horns (犀角, xījiǎo)	Happiness	
Double coins (雙錢, shuāngqián)	Wealth	
Gold or silver ingot (錠, dìng)		
Coral (珊瑚, shānhú)		
Ruyi scepter (如意, rúyì)		

=== Eight emblems of the Immortals ===
The eight emblems of the Immortals are typically eight items representing the Eight Immortals and their powers can also appear on clothing and textile. These motifs were typically used by taoists.

Type		Attributes	Images
Fan		Attributes of the fan of Zhongli Quan.	
Lotus flower		Attributes of the lotus of He Xiangu.	
Peach			
Bamboo			
Gourd with medicine		Attributes of the double gourd of Li Tieguai.	
Basket of flowers		Attributes of the flower basket of Lan Caihe	
Musical instruments	Two castanets	Attributes of the castanets of Cao Guojiu.	
Musical instruments	Flute	Attributes of the flute of Han Xiangzi	

=== Ashtamangala/ Eight Sacred Buddhist Symbols ===
The Ashtamangala can also appear on clothing, such as the dragon robes of the Qing dynasty. These motifs were typically used by Buddhists.

Type	Attributes	Images
Vase	Harmony	
Parasol	dignity	
Victory banner	Rank and nobility	
Endless knot	Happiness	
Lotus	Purity	
Twin fish	Wealth	
Conch	Protection	
Wheel of Dharma		

=== Other sets of ornaments ===
Type			Symbolism	Images
Twelve Chinese zodiac				
Five poisons				
"Sea water, river and cliff pattern" (海水江崖纹)/ "Waves, mountains, rocks"	Rock		Peace and harmony within the country and/or harmony in the Universe, which is presided by the Emperor.	
"Sea water, river and cliff pattern" (海水江崖纹)/ "Waves, mountains, rocks"	Woshui	Concentric semicircles	Peace and harmony within the country and/or harmony in the Universe, which is presided by the Emperor.	
"Sea water, river and cliff pattern" (海水江崖纹)/ "Waves, mountains, rocks"	Turbulent Waves	Surging sea waves	Peace and harmony within the country and/or harmony in the Universe, which is presided by the Emperor.	
"Sea water, river and cliff pattern" (海水江崖纹)/ "Waves, mountains, rocks"	Lishui	Diagonal straight/ wavy lines	Peace and harmony within the country and/or harmony in the Universe, which is presided by the Emperor.	

== List of natural landscape elements used in textile and clothing ==
=== Clouds/ auspicious clouds ===
Clouds, also referred as auspicious clouds (xiangyun 祥云), are the symbols of good fortune and happiness, as well as a good omen of peace and the symbol of heavens. Clouds designs have been used in artworks as early as the Eastern Zhou dynasty. In the ancient era, auspicious clouds were of associated with deities and good fortune.

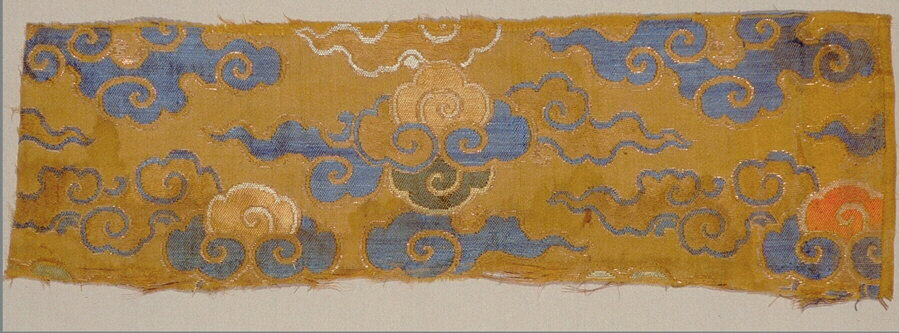

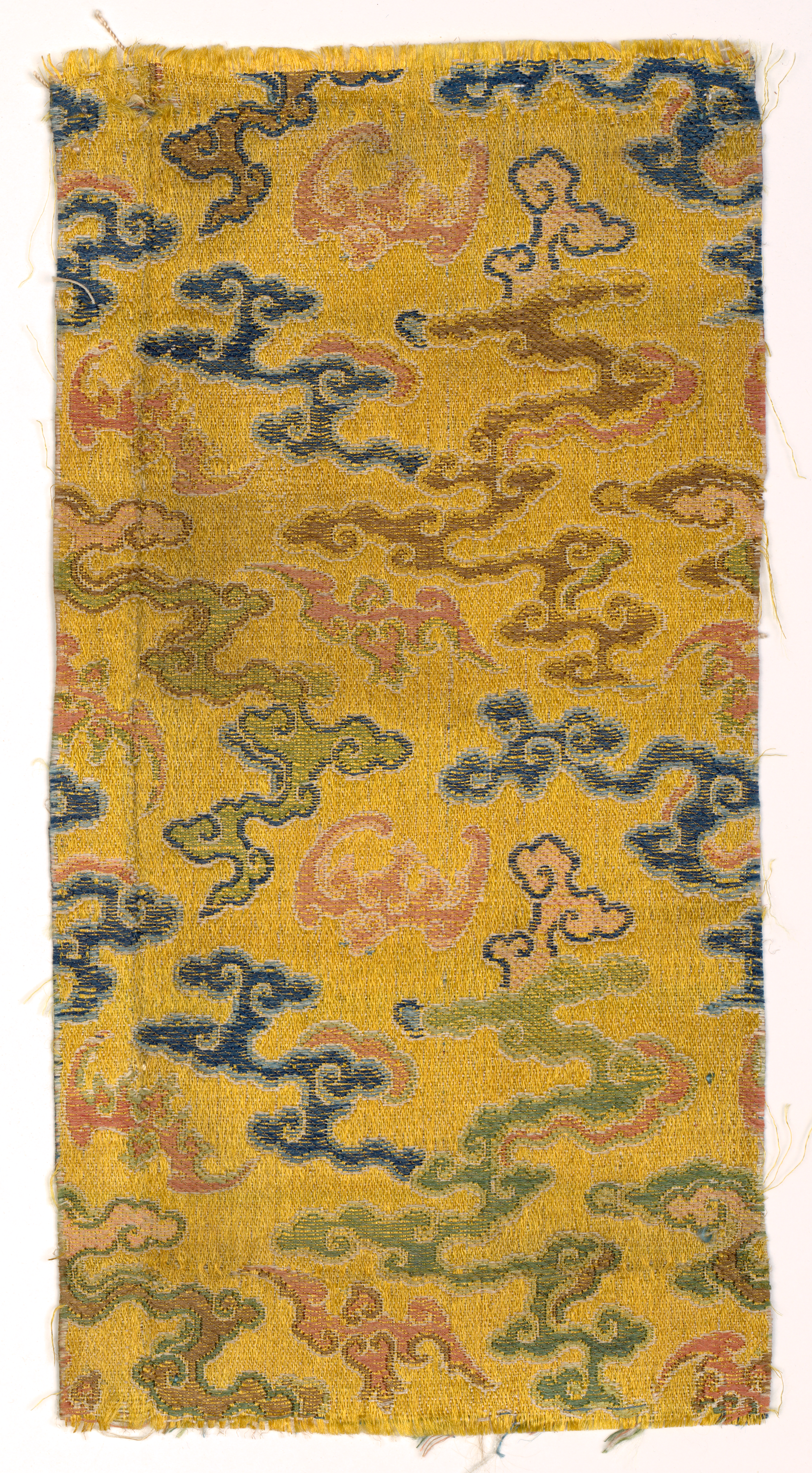

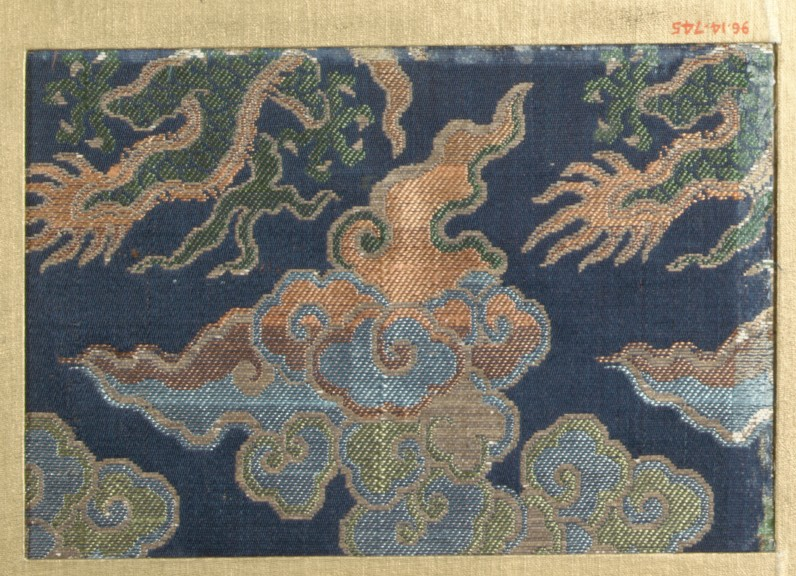

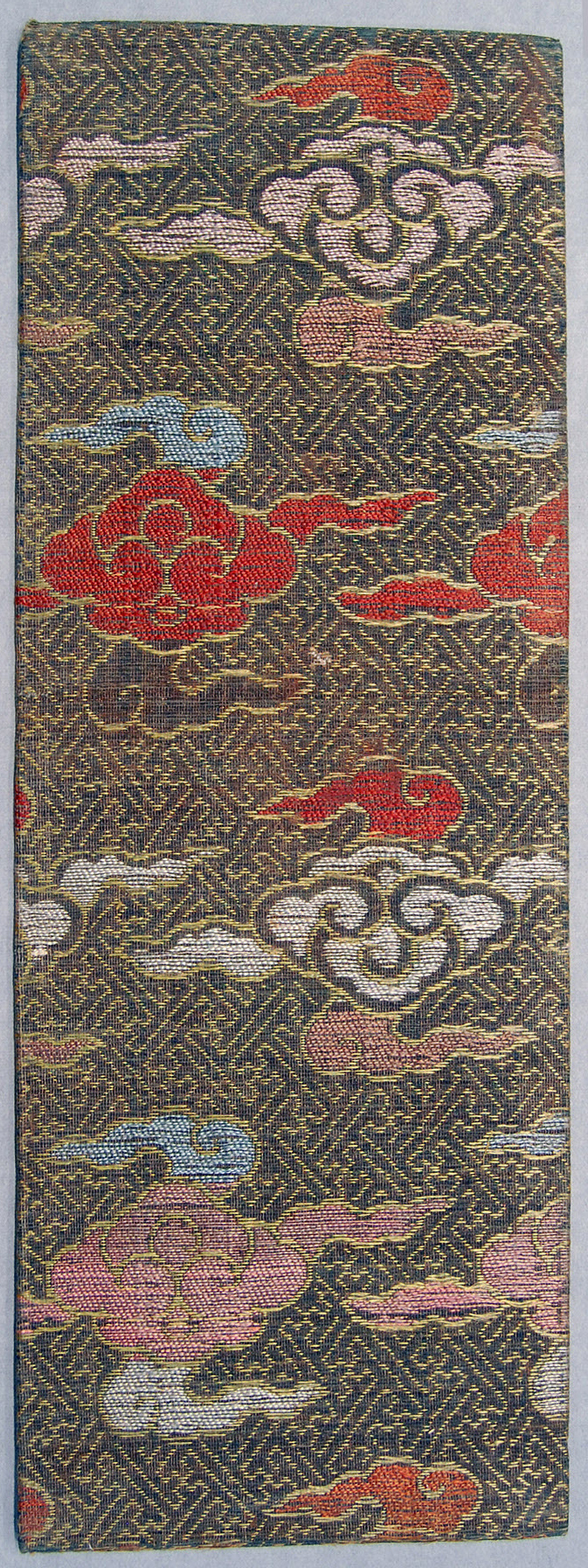

=== Mountains and rocks ===
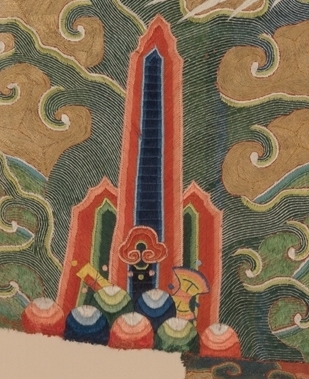
Rocks which represents the mountain, Ming dynasty

Mountains were symbolism of stability, greatness, and stable governance.

Mountains are also one of the twelve ornaments which are embroidered on the Imperial robes. The rock found in the bottom-centre of the Qing dragon robes, represents the sacred mountain (山, shān), one of the Twelve ornaments.

=== Stars and constellation ===
Stars were typically represented by small circles. When several stars (circles) are connected with lines, they became a constellation.

==== Sun ====
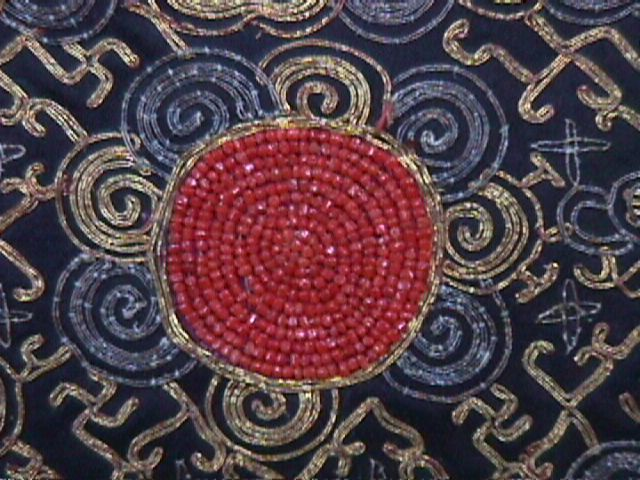
Sun on a rank badge represents the Emperor

On the Qing dynasty rank badge (buzi), the sun disk is typically depicted as a red disc, which represents the emperor.

In the Qing dynasty, animals, birds and creatures on a rank badges need to face the sun disc as symbol of loyalty to the Emperor.

==== Xingchen/ Three stars ====
Xingchen (星辰), is depicted as several small circle, symbolizes the indefinite Universe. The number 3 has the meaning of having made everything and formed the beginning of things; this belief comes from Laozi, who said that the universe made the original matter of the Earth.

=== Waves and tides ===
Types	Description	Symbolism/Meaning	Images
Lishui	Diagonal, parallel, (typically multicoloured) stripes or wavy lines.	Represent the "deep sea"	
Tides	Turbulent waves		
Woshui	Concentric semicircles		

== Trees and plants ==
=== Pine tree ===
Evergreen pine tree was a symbol of longevity.

== Flowers ==
Chrysanthemum

Chrysanthemum flowers symbolize longevity and autumn season. They could be used to decorate the garments of women.

Lotus flowers

Lotus flowers are symbols of purity and fruitfulness. Double lotus are wishes for blessing marriage and harmony.

Peach blossoms

Peach blossoms are symbols of spring season and happiness.

Peony flowers

Peony flowers are symbols of prosperity, wealth, and honour; they also a symbol of spring and feminine beauty. Peonies are often used on Chinese women's clothing.

Plum blossoms

Plum blossoms are symbol of winter season as it blooms in the cold. They are also one of the most famous flowers in China and are common perceived as a symbol of longevity. It is used as decoration to decorate Xifu, Chinese opera costumes as it is an indicator of wisdom and feminine charm.

Xiaolunhua or falunhua

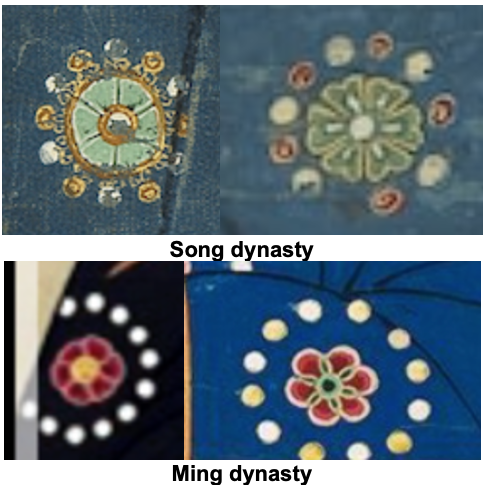
Xiaolunhua (also known as falunhua) motifs decorating the diyi of the Song and Ming dynasty empresses

Xiaolunhua or falunhua, are motifs used to decorate the falunhua of the Song and Ming dynasty empresses. (Note: see page diyi for references)

== Seeds ==
Lotus seeds were auspicious patterns, which were used to embroider Chinese cloth shoes, such as xiuhuaxie (Chinese: 绣花鞋; lit. 'embroidered shoes'); they were symbol of the birth of a child.

== Fruits ==
The combination of longevity peaches, bergamot, and pomegranate represents multiple children and longevity.

Gourds

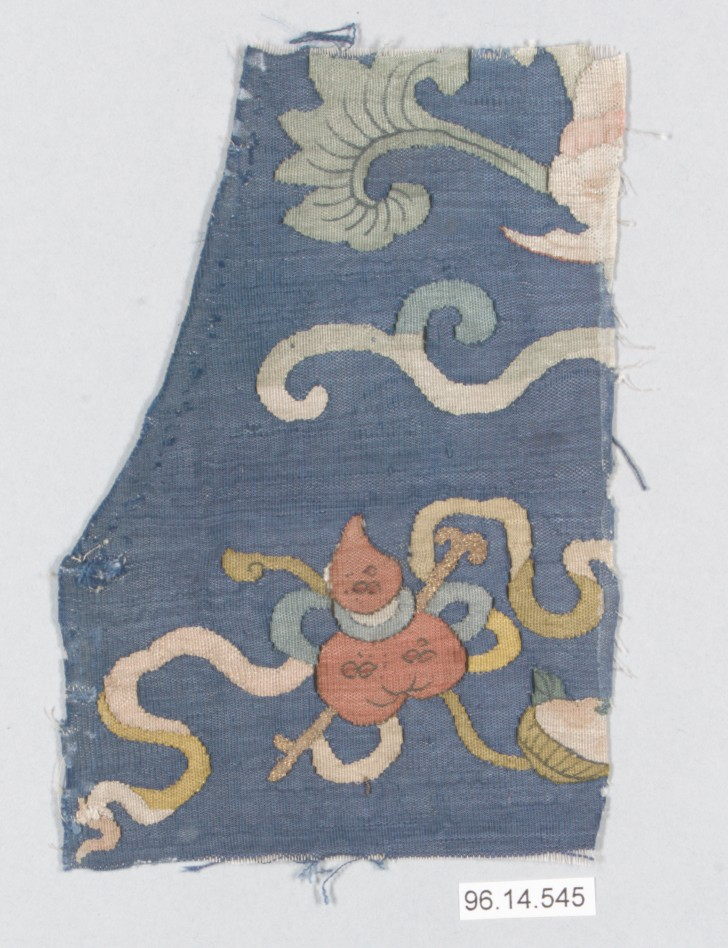
Gourd embroidery

A gourd is a symbol of fertility. Doubles gourds are associated with immortals and deities.

Peaches

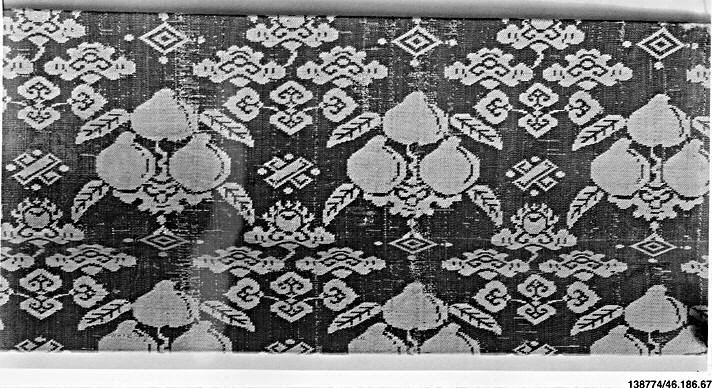
Textile with peaches motif

A peach is a symbol of longevity; peaches were also associated with the deity Shoulao (God of longevity).

Pomegranate

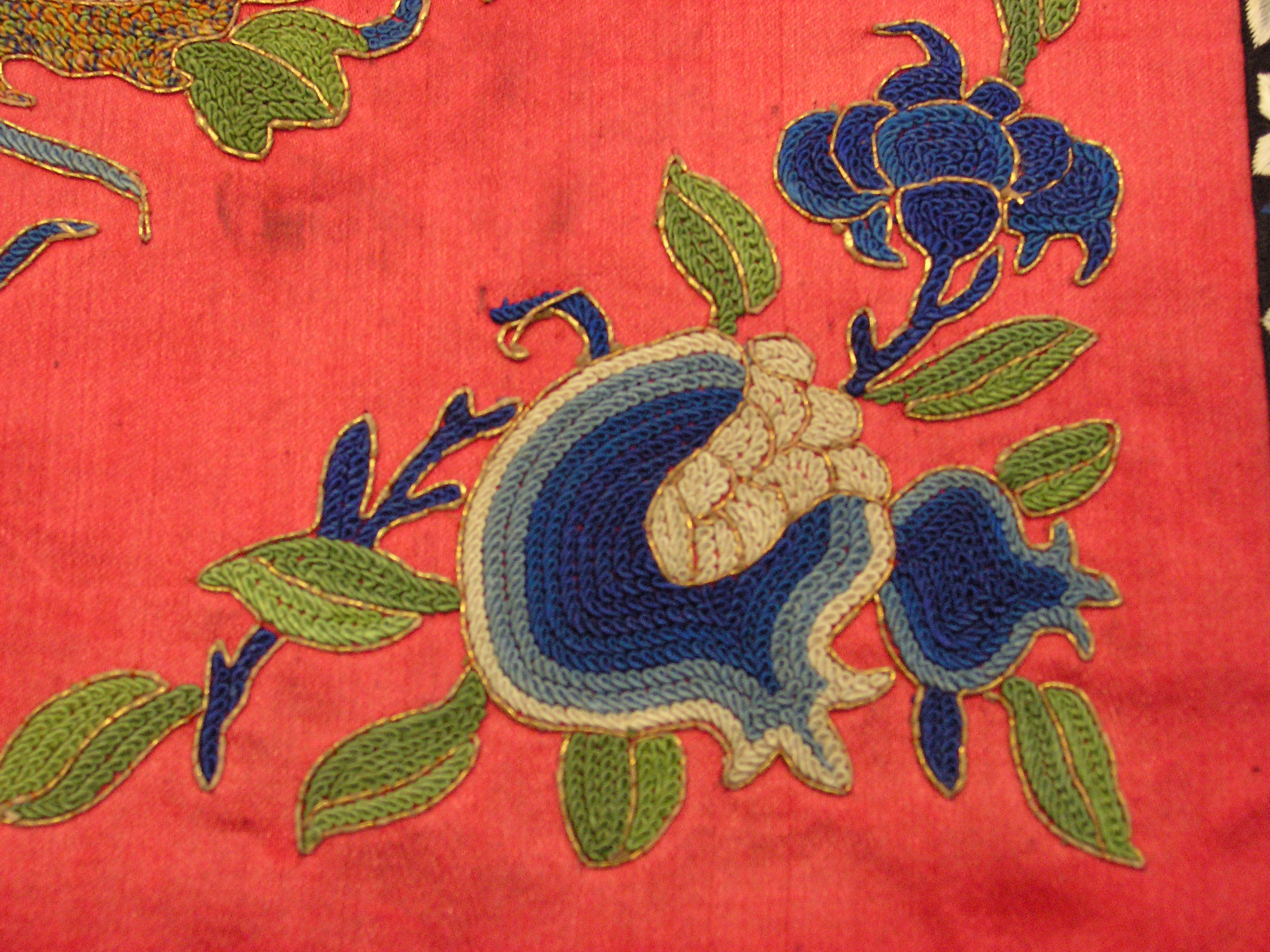
Embroidery of a pomegranate

A pomegranate (Chinese: 石榴; pinyin: shíliǔ) is an auspicious pattern which represents the "abundance in all things" (especially, sons). It can also symbolize multiple children or offspring multiplied. Pomegranates can be used to embroider Chinese cloth shoes, such as xiuhuaxie (Chinese: 绣花鞋; lit. 'embroidered shoes').

== Mushroom ==
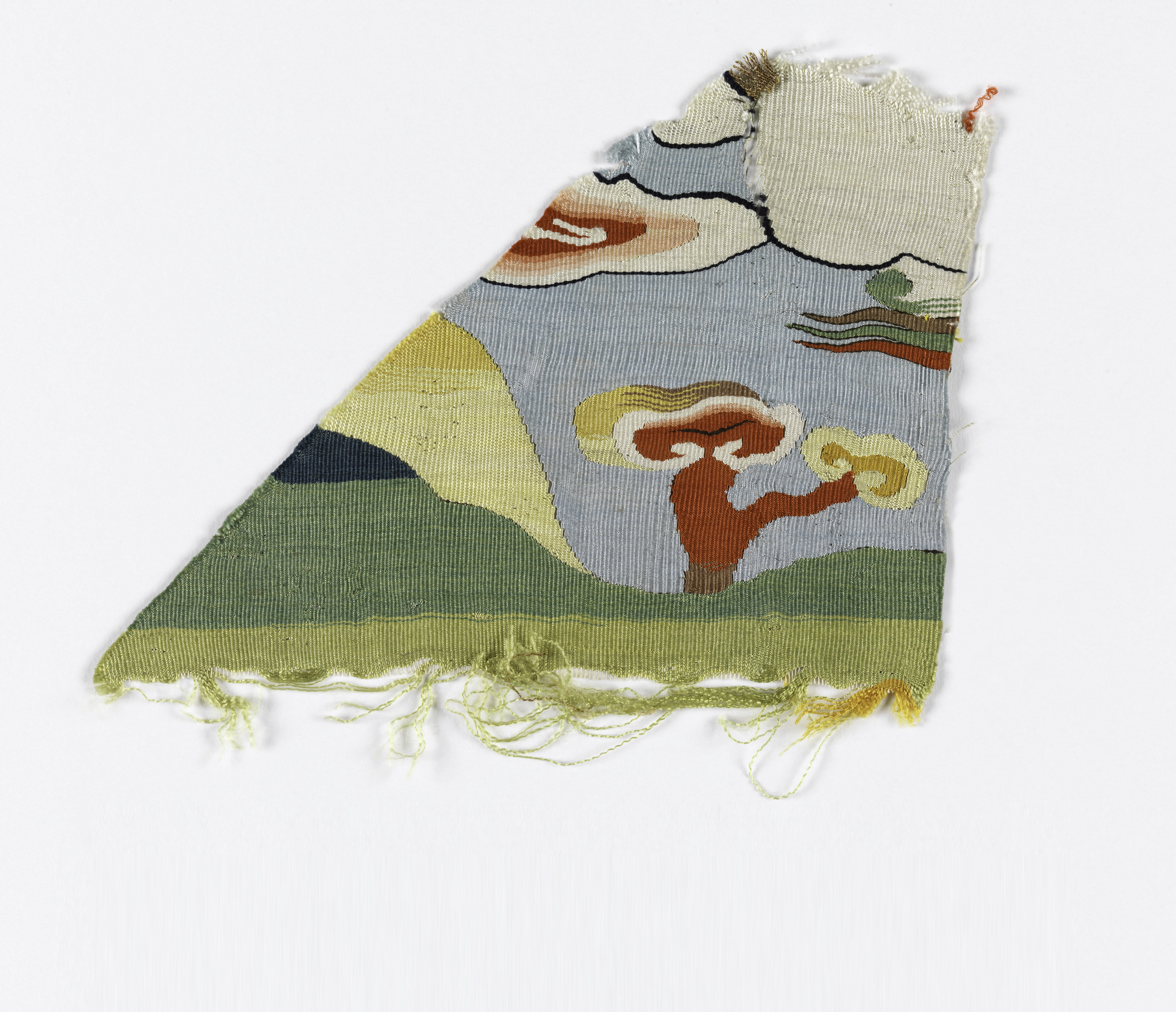
Lingzhi mushroom on a rank badge

Lingzhi mushroom can be used on clothing, such as court clothing. The auspicious characteristics of the lingzhi mushroom is a unique aspect in Chinese culture and were even worshipped in ancient times.According ancient Taoist belief, the consumption of lingzhi allows one to never grow old and die. Confucian scholars have been referring to the Lingzhi as "fortune herb" or "fortune grass" since the Han dynasty and considered the circular lines on the lingzhi cap as an auspicious symbol (or as fortune halos). Lingzhi is therefore a symbol of Longevity, luck, fortune, peace, prosperity.

== Auspicious mammal animals ==
Many animal motifs are found on Chinese textile and are often found in combined with cloud designs. Textile patterns with animals and clouds have been popular, especially during the Han to the Jin dynasty around the 1st to the 3rd century.

=== Bats ===
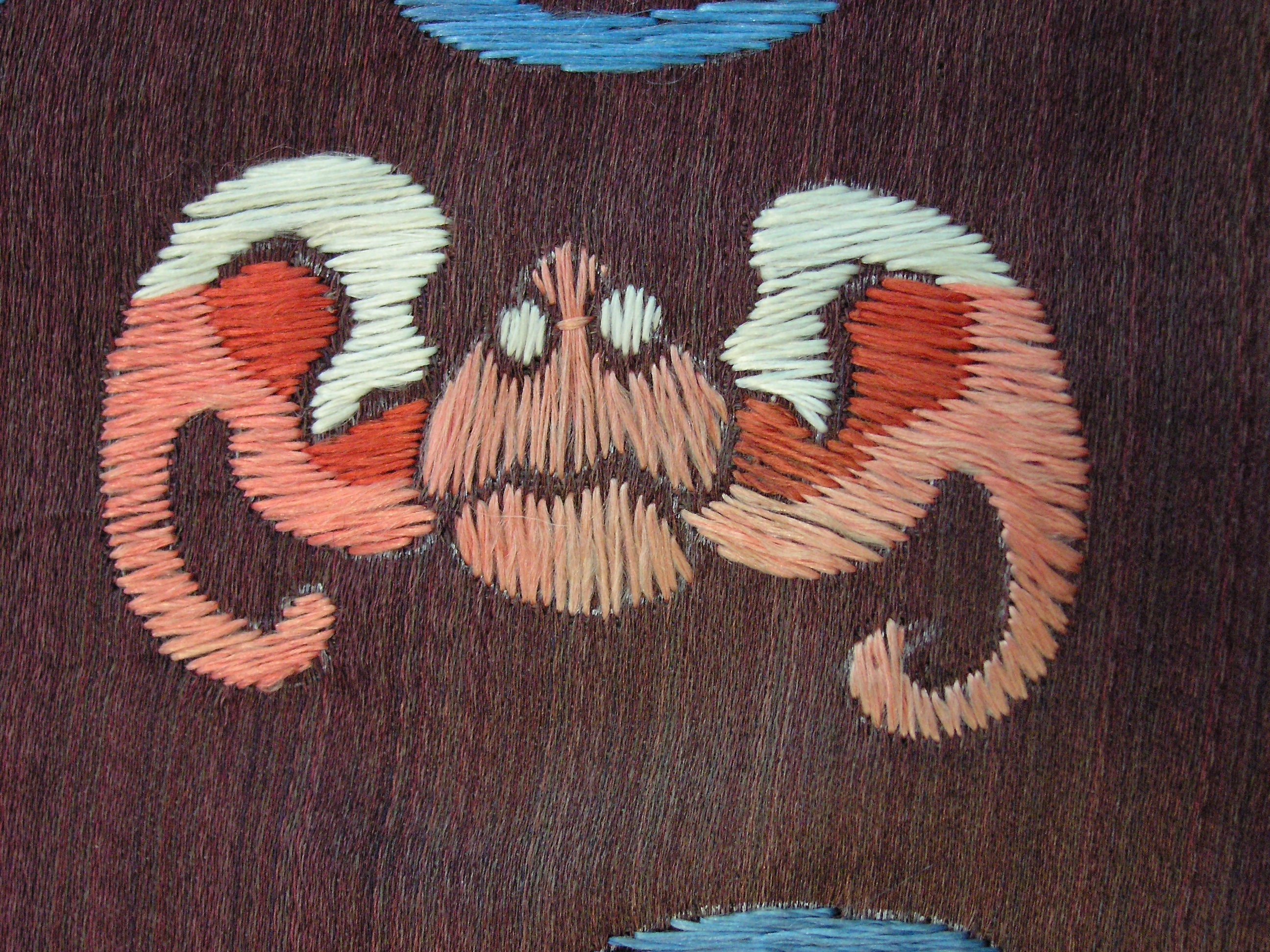
A single red bat (hongfu)

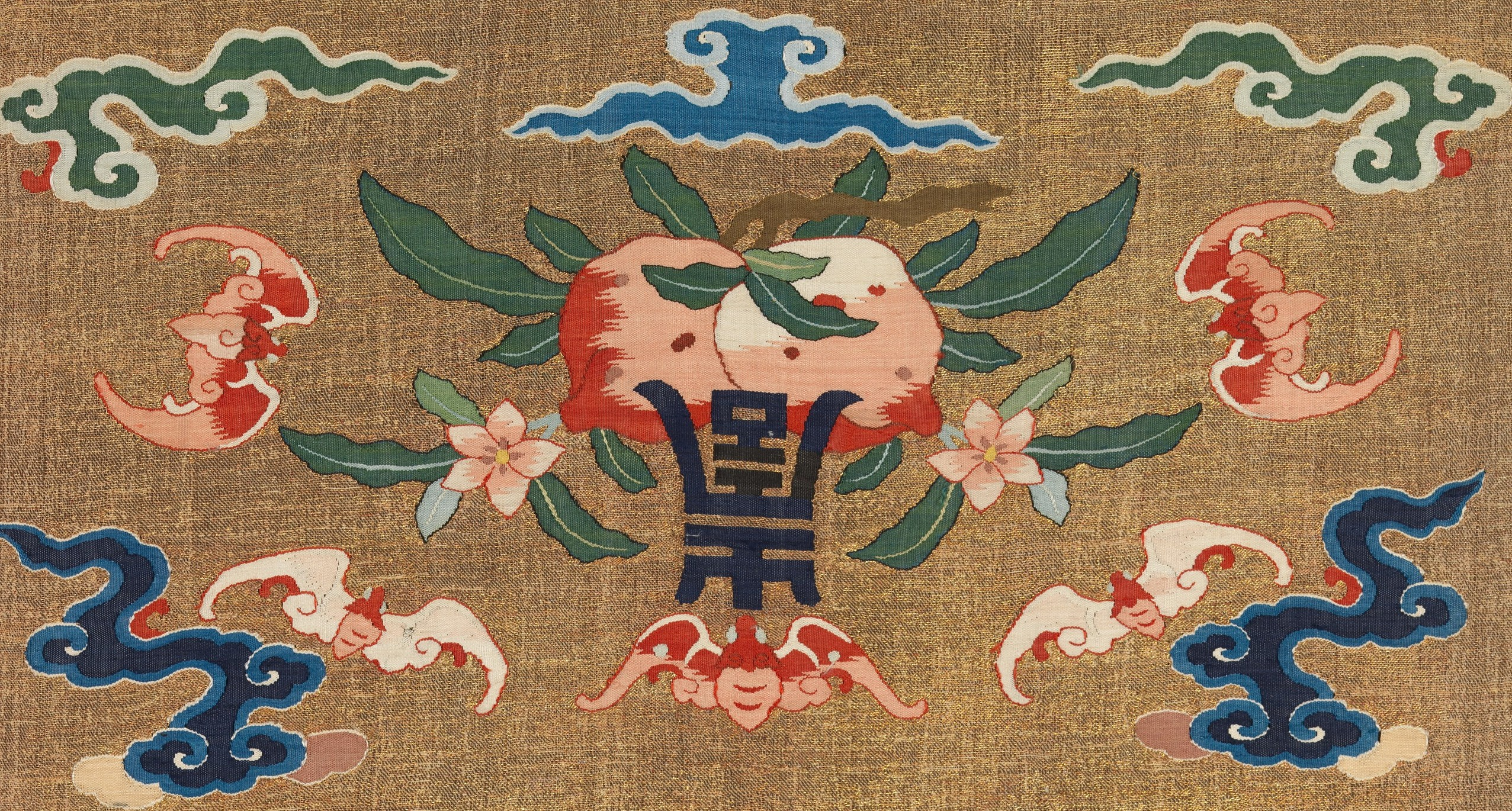
Five red bats (hongfu) with the stylized character shou (壽)

Chinese bat (Chinese: 蝠; pinyin: fú) motifs often look like a butterfly. A bat is a symbol of happiness. Bats have an auspicious meaning as the Chinese words for hongfu (Chinese: 红蝠; lit. 'red bats') sounds similar to the phrase "abundant good fortune".

Bats can be coupled with the Chinese character wan, written as《卐》and/or《卍》in Chinese characters, to expresses "ten thousand-fold wishes for good fortune and happiness".

Five bats (Chinese: 五蝠; pinyin: wǔfú) represent five types of good fortune, called the Five blessings (Chinese: 五福; pinyin: wǔfú), which are good health, good wealth, longevity, love of virtue and a natural/ peaceful death.

=== Deer ===
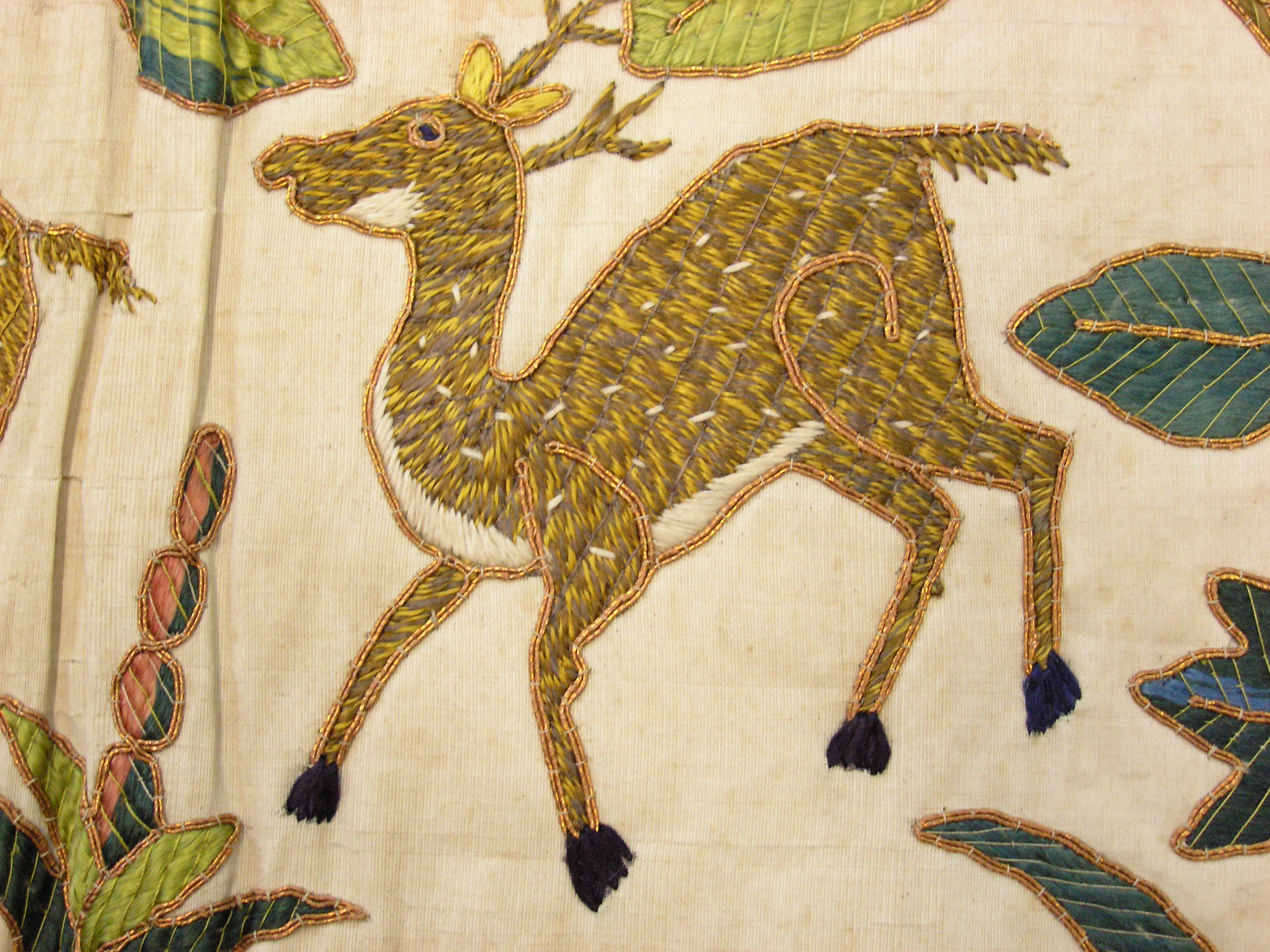
A deer

A deer is a symbol of longevity. The Chinese name of deer is Lu is also a homophone for Chinese character 'wealth' and 'official promotion'; it is therefore also the symbol of Luxing (the god of rank and remuneration).

=== Lions ===
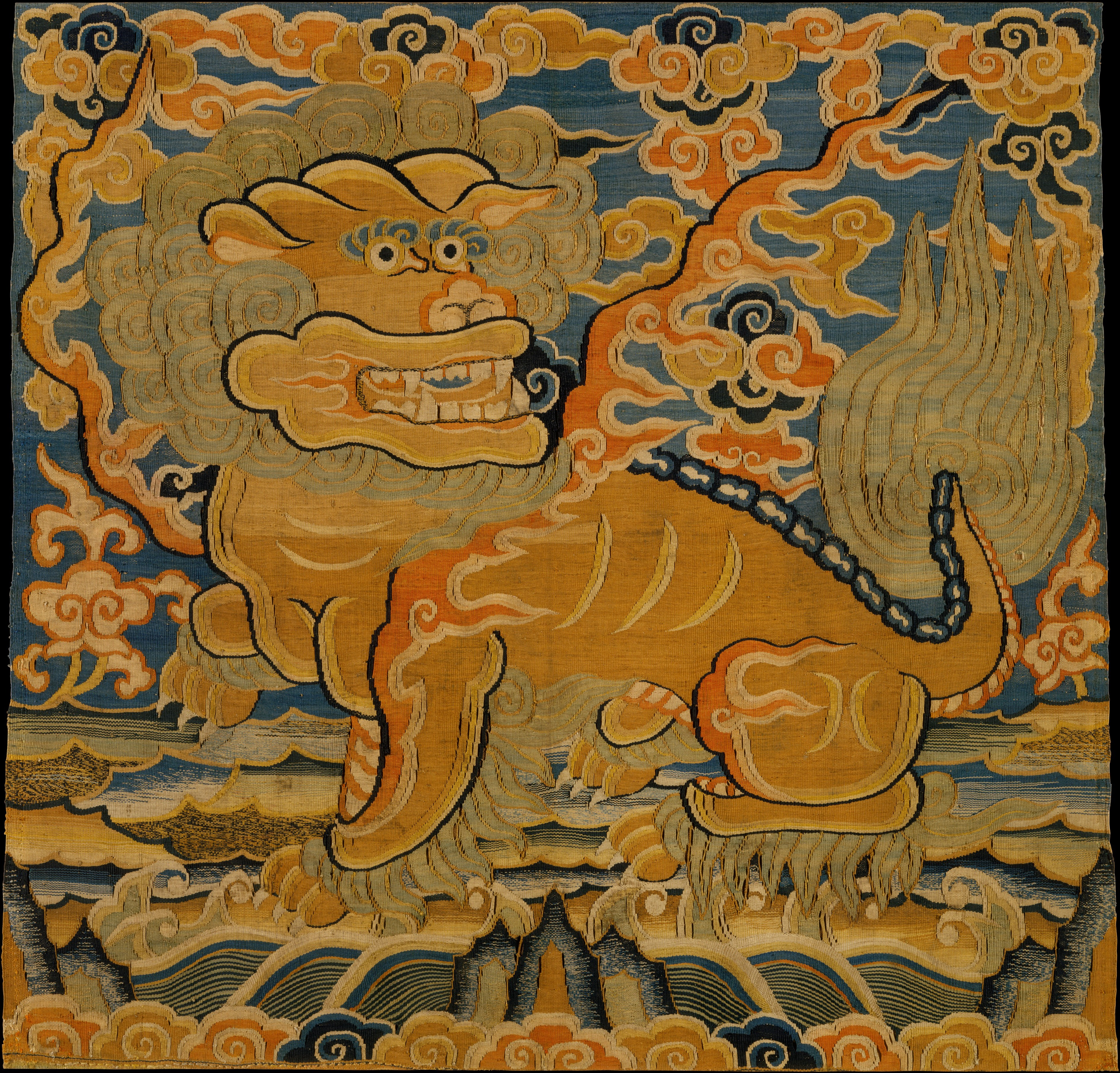
Lion on a rank badge, early Ming dynasty

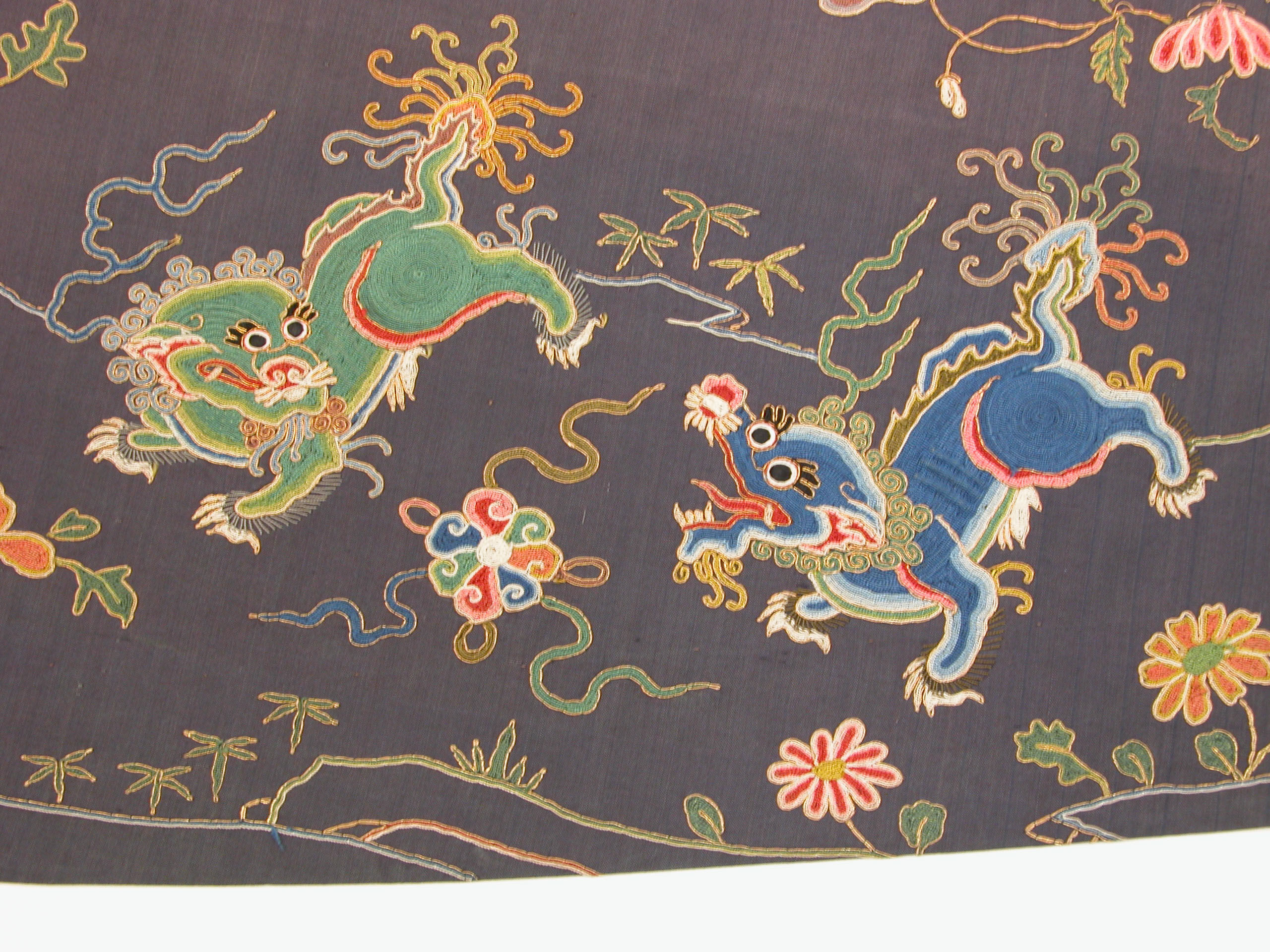
Pair of lions chasing after a ball on a woman's informal robe, Qing dynasty, early 18th century

The Chinese admired lions for their strength and courage; therefore, lions became associated with military and hunting prowess; they were typically found on the military rank badges on the Ming and Qing dynasties.

=== Rabbits ===
Rabbits, especially white rabbits, are symbols of longevity. Textiles which show a rabbit motif are strongly associated with women and the moon (yin forces) and therefore, textiles with a rabbit on it would typically only be worn by women and eunuchs.

==== Yuetu/ Yutu/ Moon rabbit ====
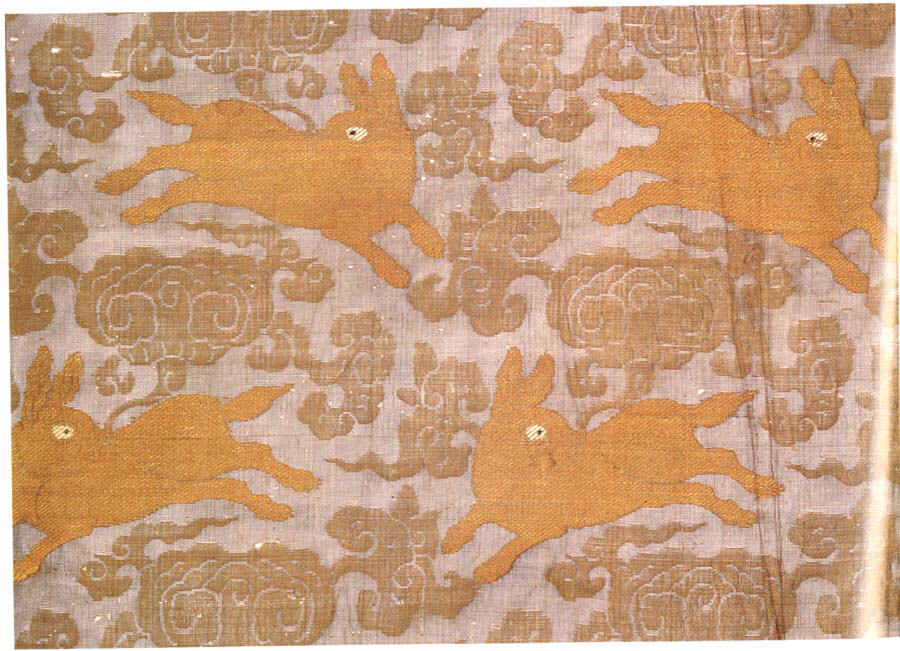
Rabbits running amongst clouds, textile panel, Ming dynasty, late 16–17th century

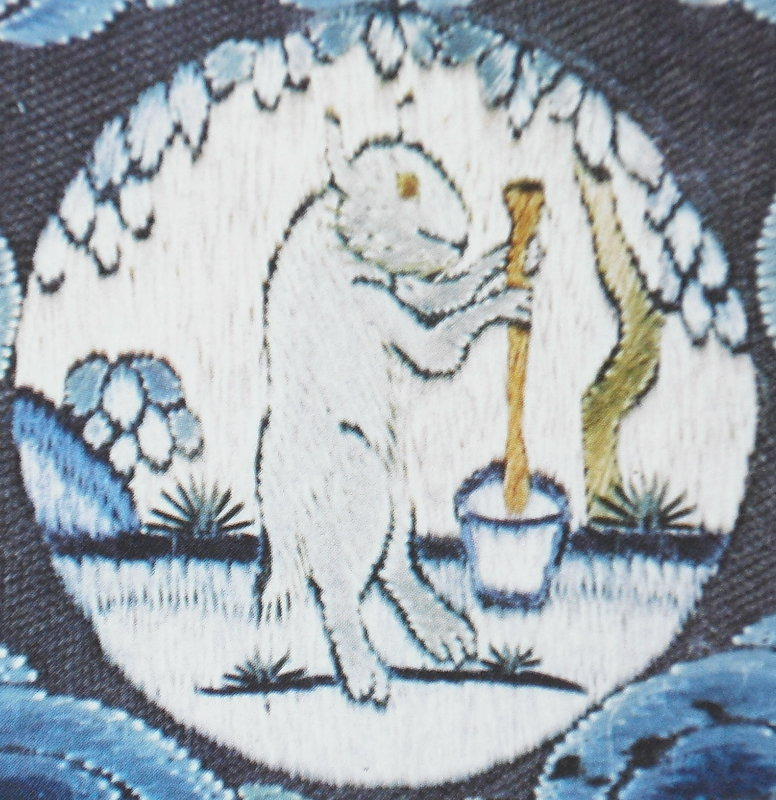
Embroidered jade rabbit making elixir of immortality, imperial robe, 18th century

Yuetu (lit. "moon rabbit"), also known as yutu (jade rabbit) is a symbol of the moon. According to ancient Chinese legends, the moon rabbit (and/or rabbits) lived on the moon. Following this ancient belief, rabbits which run amongst clouds are intended to symbolize the moon.

The moon rabbit is one of the Twelve Ornaments, which adorn the Emperor's imperial robe; it is depicted as a rabbit in a disc, which represents the moon.

=== Tigers ===
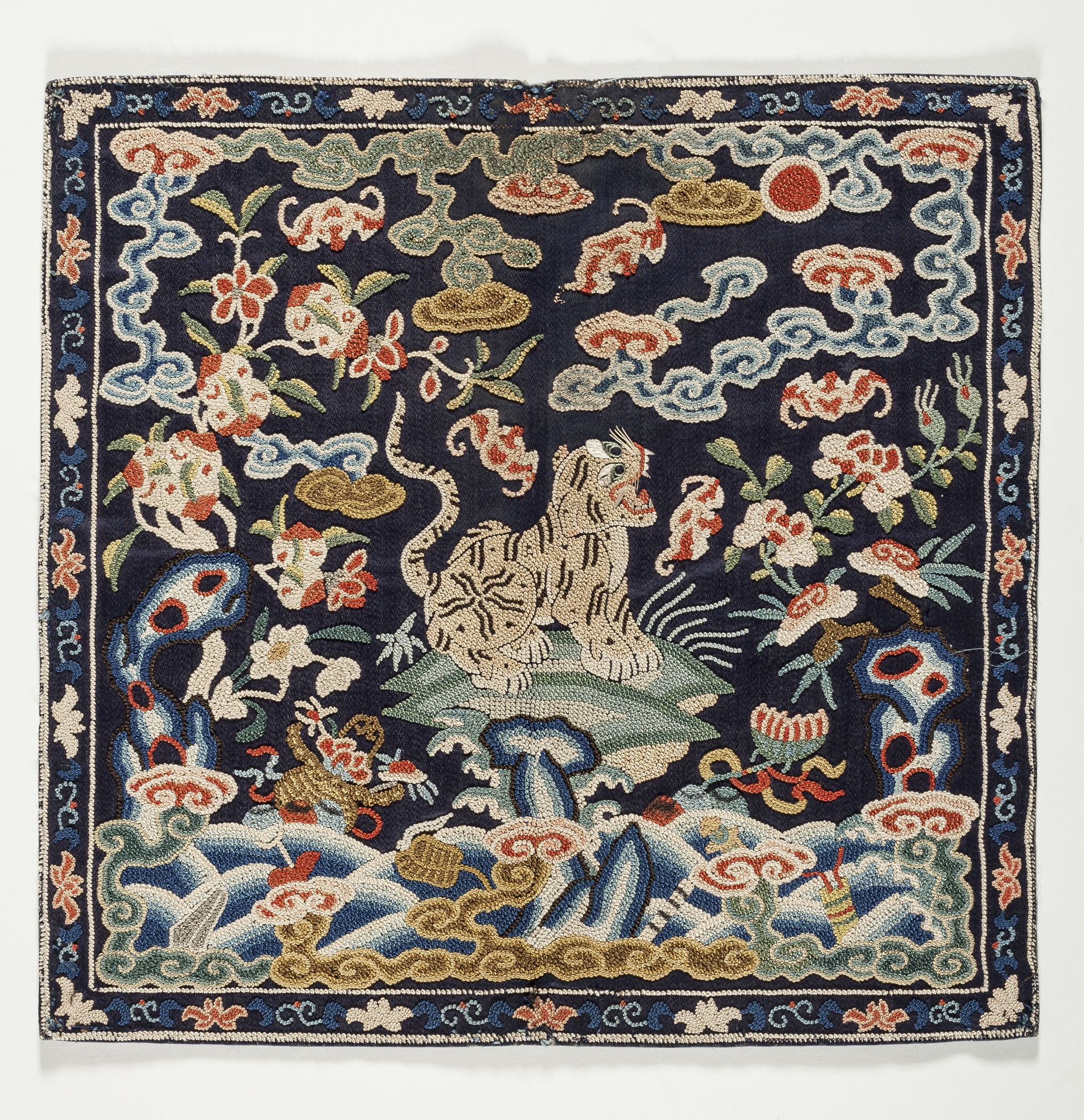
Rank Badge (Buzi) of the Fourth Military Rank with Tiger, Ming dynasty

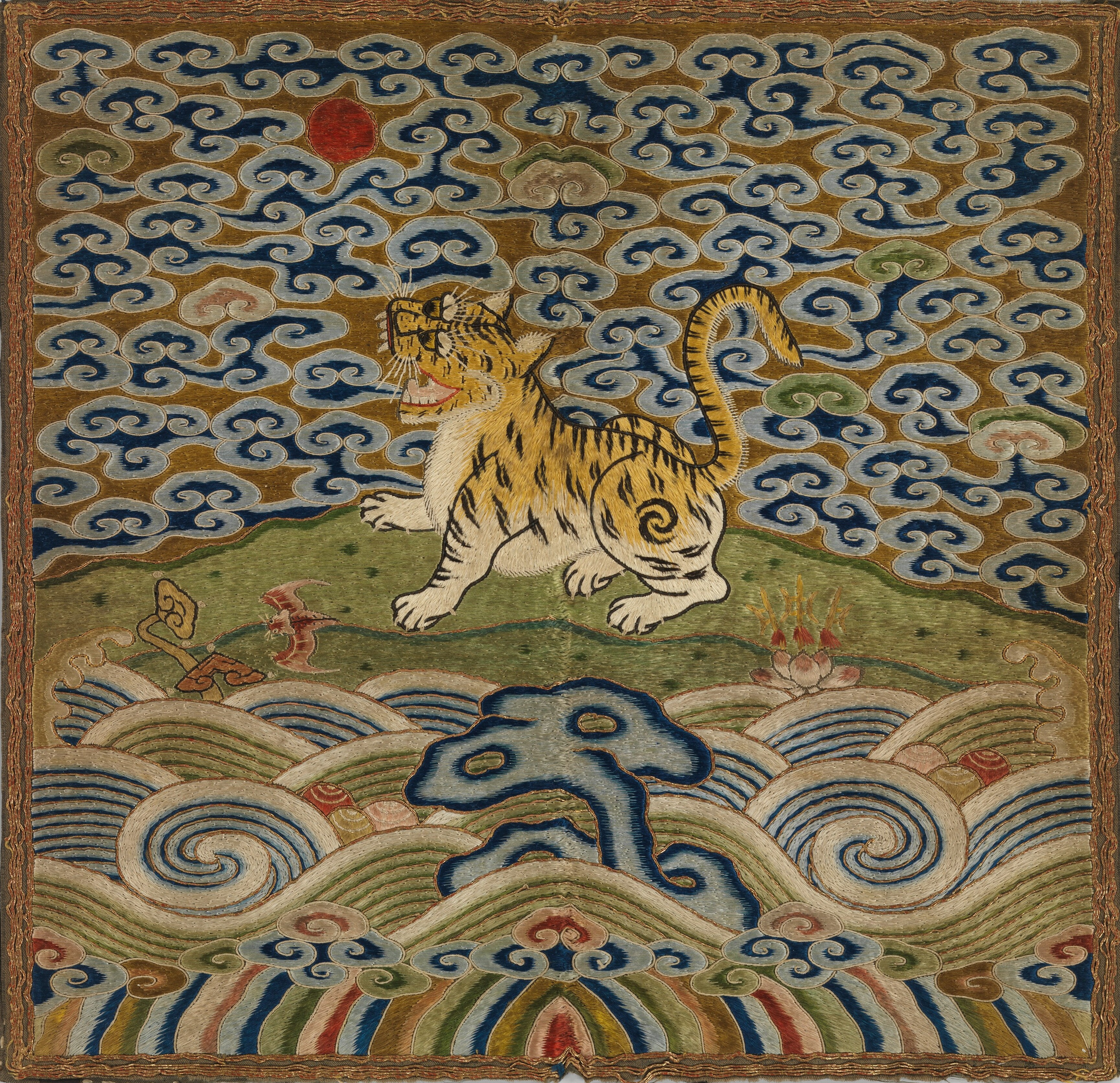
Tiger rank badge, Qing dynasty

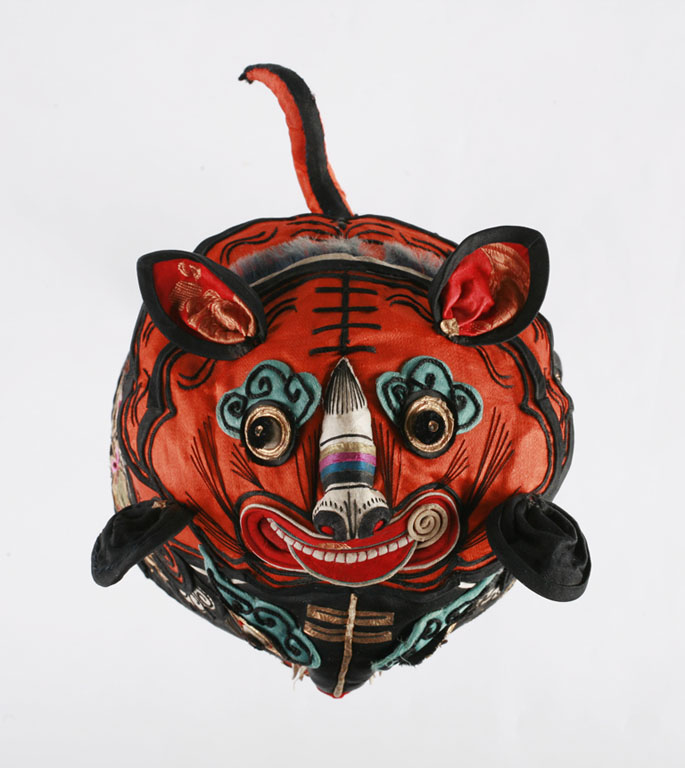
Tiger head hat of a child

Tigers were symbols of masculinity and was seen as a fighting power as the Lord of the animal kingdom. Tiger heads are often found in Xifu where it is used to decorate military costumes.

== Auspicious birds ==
On textiles, birds were often inspired by paintings, literature, and by observation the natural surroundings; textiles which show birds paired with flowers originated from huaniaohua paintings, which were already popular during the Tang dynasty before gaining more social significance near the end of the Northern Song dynasty.

Birds have an important place in Chinese culture as they are perceived as divine envoys and the heralds of auspicious events. Birds were associated with a noble character while pairs of birds were sometimes associated with marital relationship between spouses. The depiction of a crane with a phoenix, a mandarin duck, a heron, and a wagtail represents the 5 interpersonal relations according to Confucian beliefs.

=== Crane birds ===
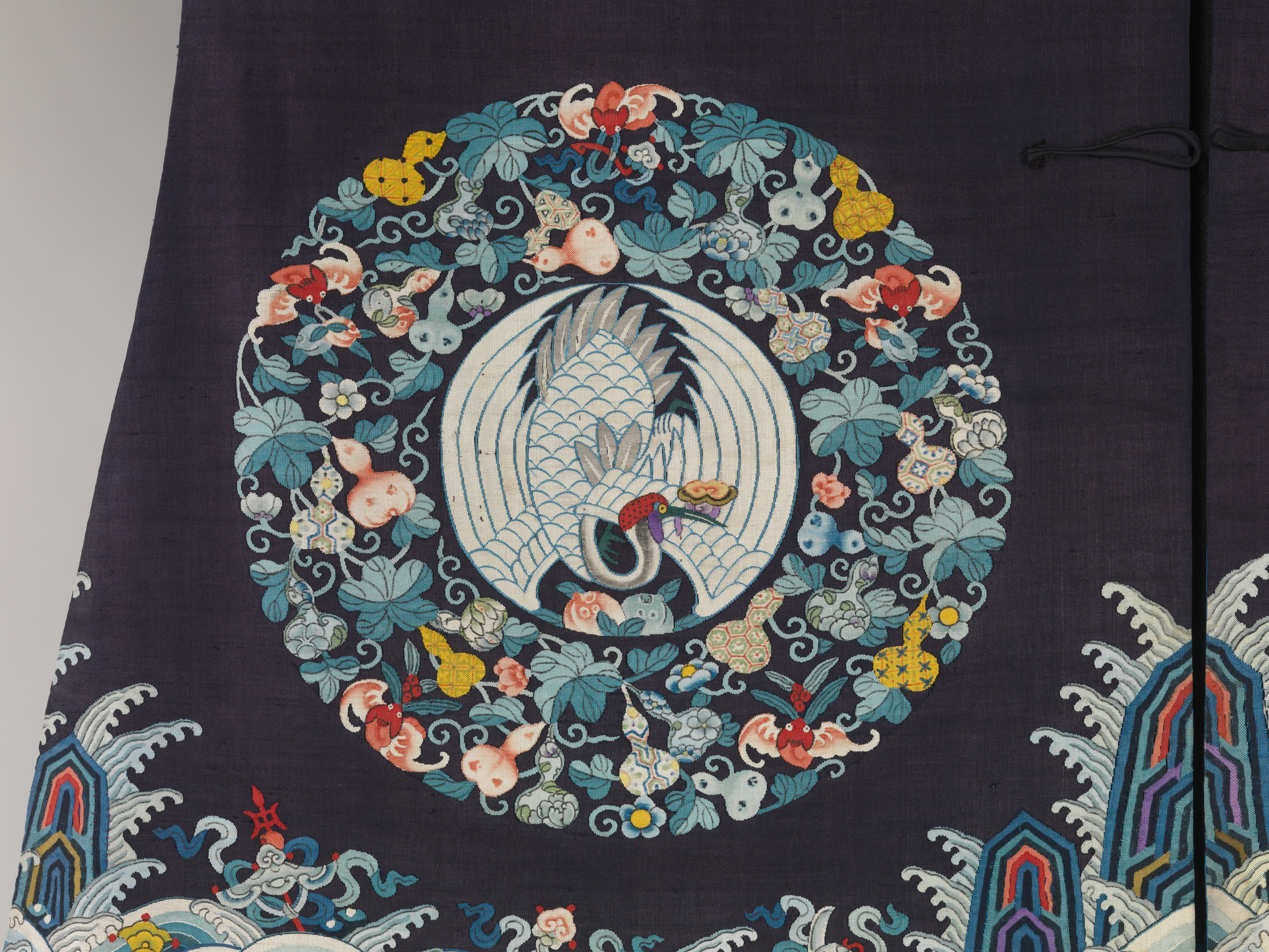
Crane and bottle gourds symbolize longevity.

A crane bird is generally a symbol of longevity, immortality and wisdom. They can also express wishes of becoming a higher official. Motif of crane with a peach of immortality in its beaks, crane with lingzhi in its beak, crane paired with bottle gourds are all symbols of longevity.

A pair of cranes expresses desire for a long matrimonial life.

Two cranes flying toward the sun are a symbol of ambition.

=== Mandarin ducks ===
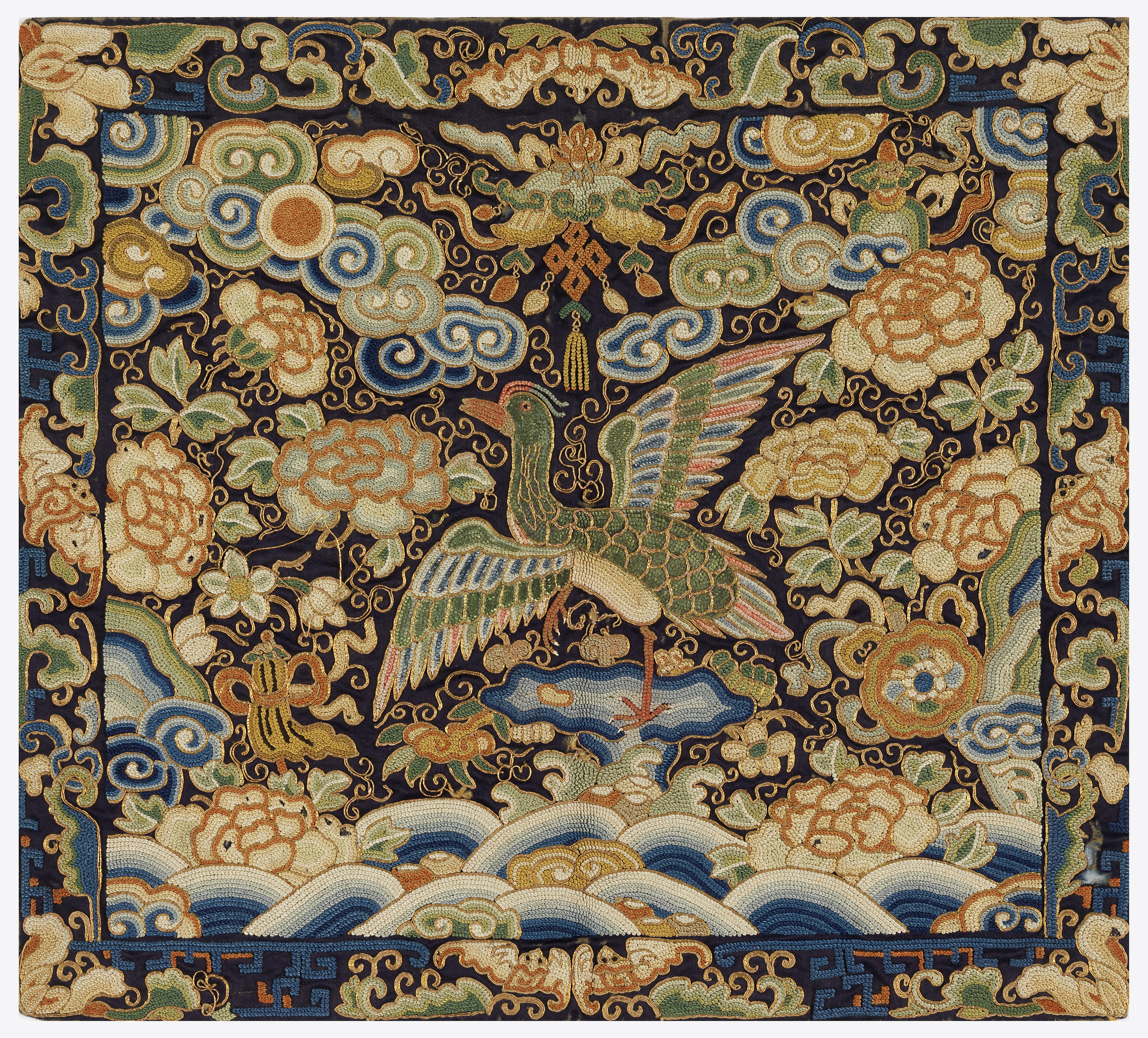
Buzi of a civil official mandarin duck facing the sun embroidery, Qing dynasty

A mandarin duck (yuanyang 鴛鴦) is a symbol of love and loyalty.

Mandarin ducks are also a symbol of marital fidelity and can be used on the clothing of brides.

Pairs of mandarin ducks were symbols of conjugal bliss and even appear on the clothing of brides. Pairs of mandarin ducks also symbolize peace, prosperity, marital stability and devotion due to the belief that mandarin ducks pair up for life and would die if they were to be separated.

=== Peacocks ===
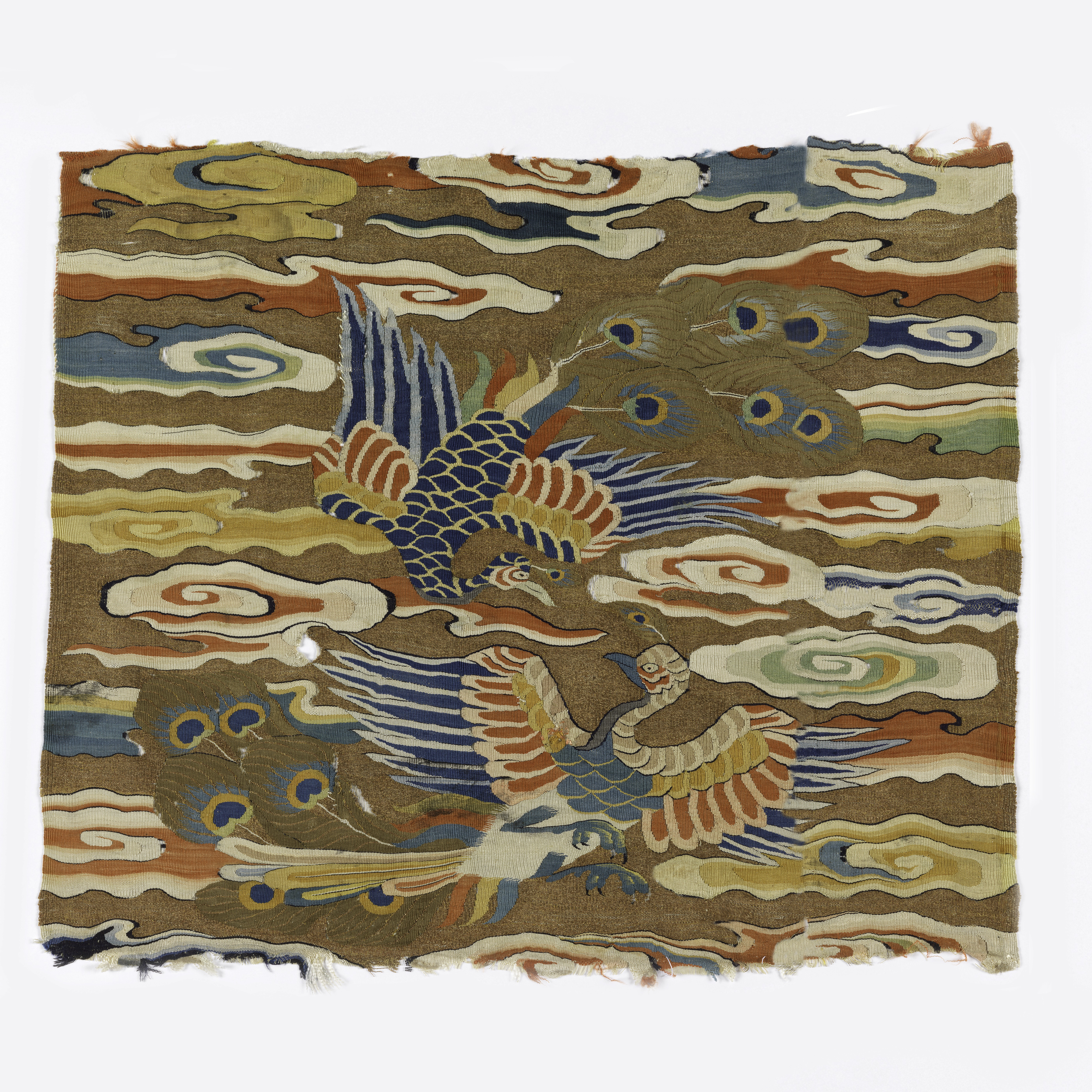
Pair of peacocks on a rank badge, Ming dynasty

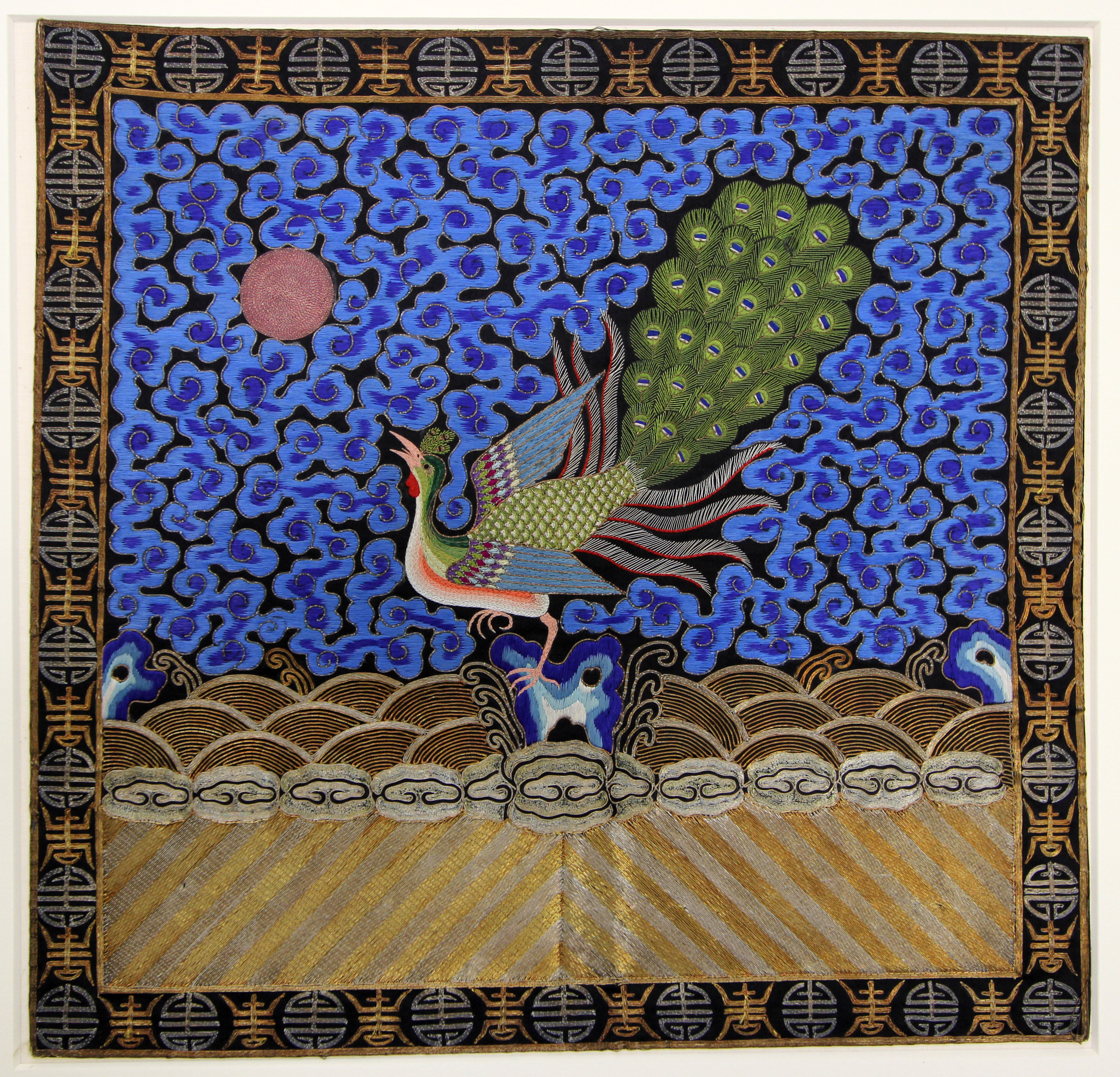
Rank badge with peacock, Qing dynasty

A peacock (孔雀 kongque) represents elegance, dignity and beauty. It is also the symbol of the sun, virtue, love, and the power of the civil officials in the Imperial court.

=== Pheasants ===
==== Colourful pheasants/ Huachong ====
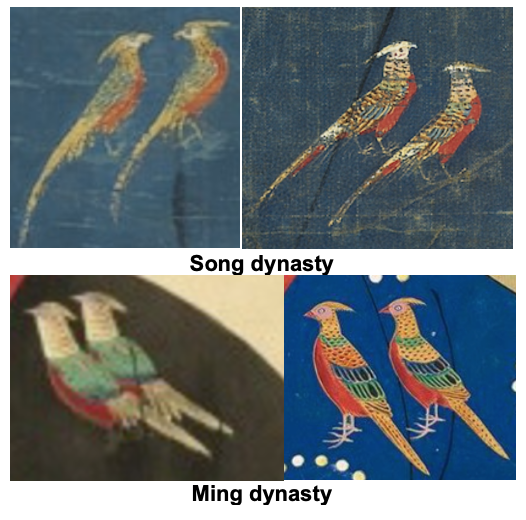
Pair of huachong motif used on the diyi of the Song and Ming dynasties empresses

Huachong is a colourful pheasant. It is also one of the twelve symbols. It is used on the imperial clothing of the Emperor and on the Diyi. On the clothing of the Emperor, it represents the emperor's abundant knowledge, peace, and elegance.

==== Golden pheasants ====
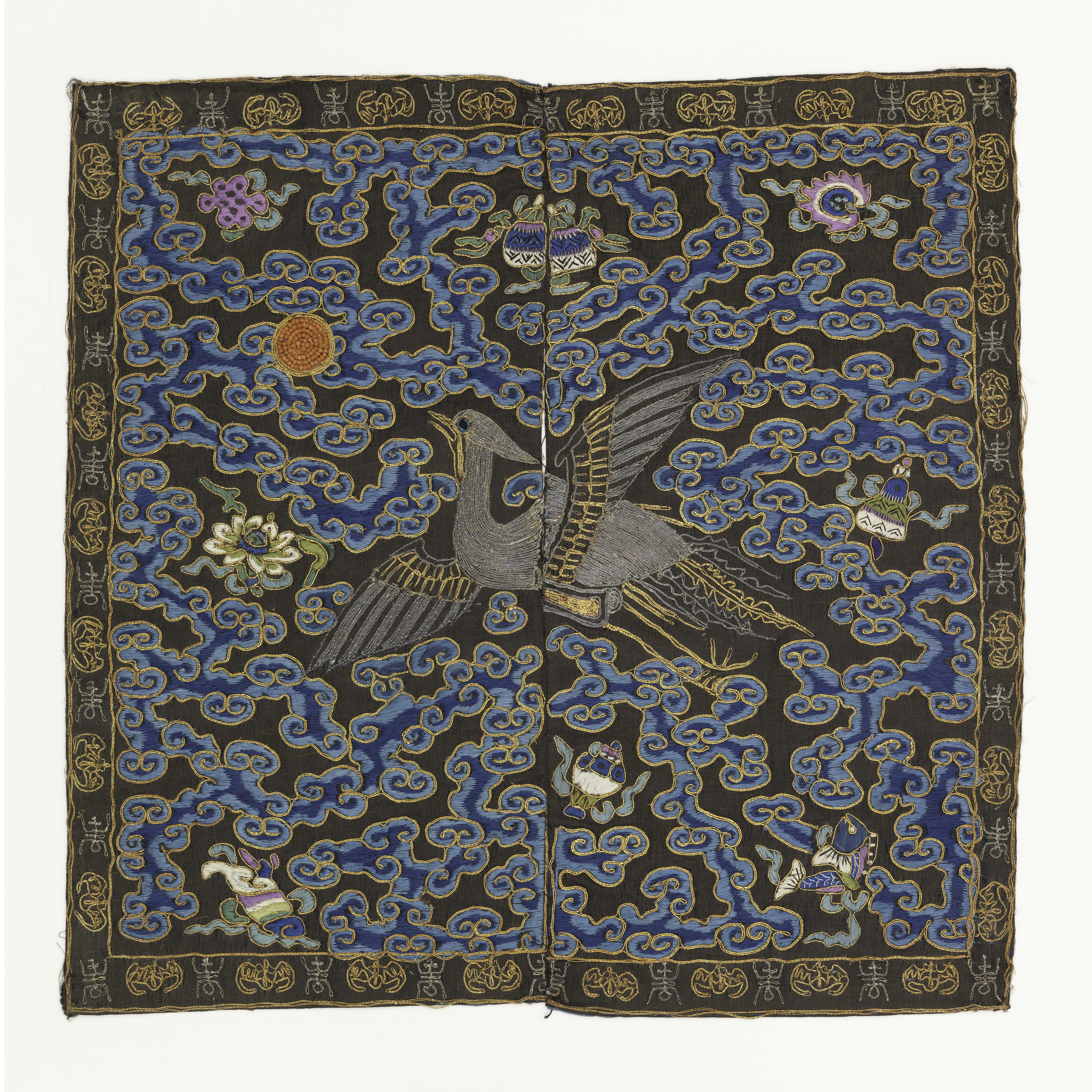
Golden pheasant embroidered on buzi, Qing dynasty

A golden pheasant (jinji 金雞) symbolizes duties and obligations.

=== Silver pheasants ===
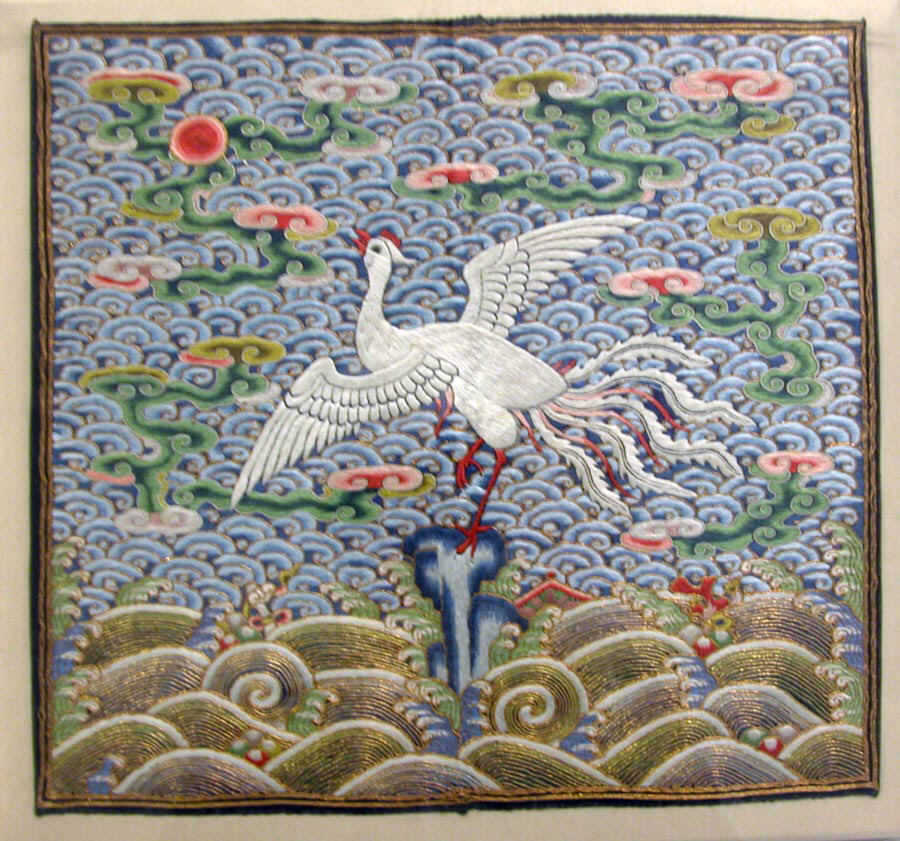
A silver pheasant embroidered on a buzi, Qing dynasty

Silver pheasant (baixian 白鷴) is a symbol of beauty and happiness.

=== Other birds ===
==== Egrets or heron ====
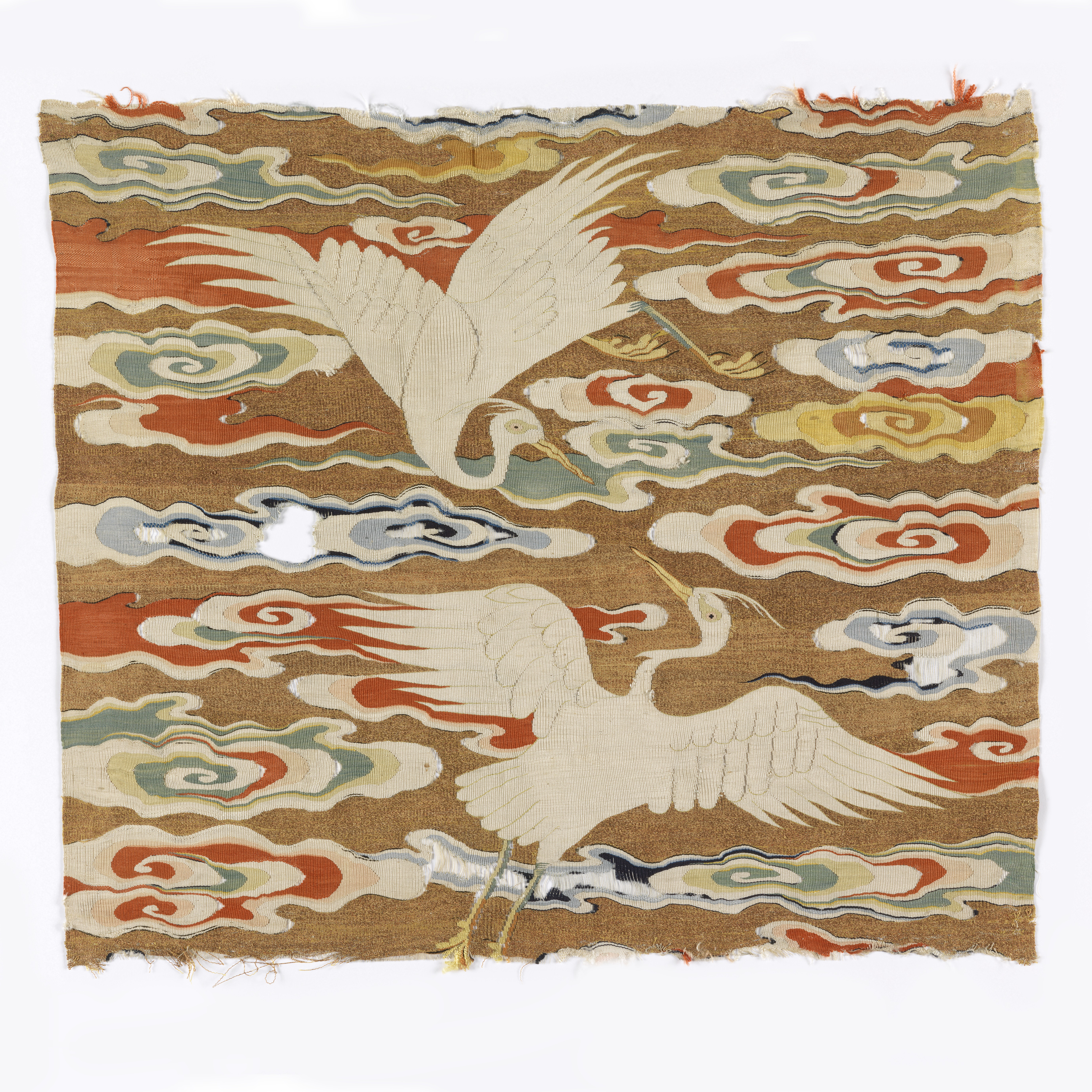
Pairs of lu (heron or egrets), Ming dynasty rank badge

Lu (鹭) symbolized a route or a path.

When lu is paired with lotuses, it is represents the Confucian ideal of what an uncorrupted official is; it can also have the meaning as "recurring success on the path to career" where Lu is the path and the official gratification and the lotus represents the "recurring" characteristic.

==== Paradise flycatcher ====
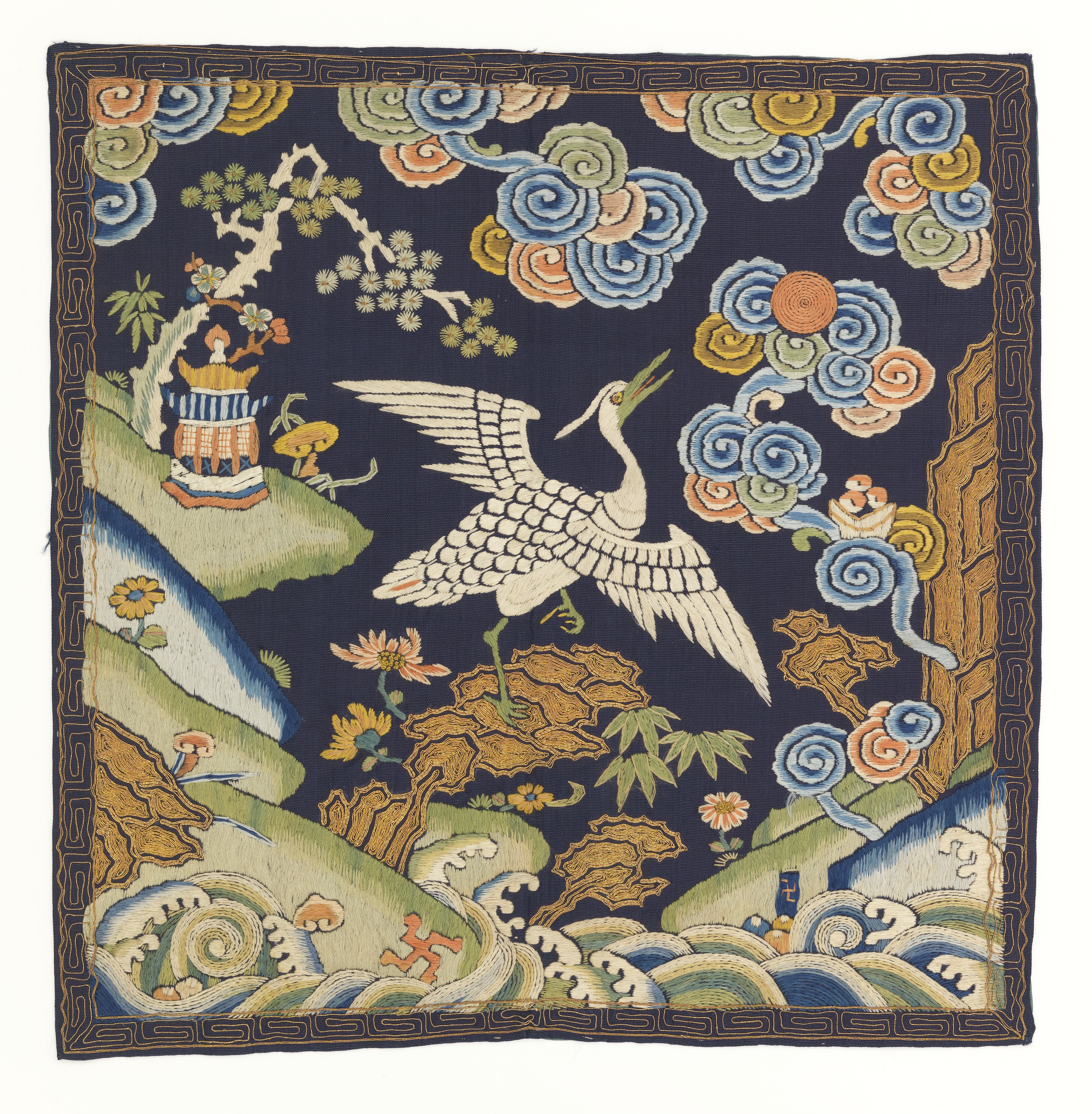
A white lu (egret or heron) on a rank badge, Qing dynasty

Paradise flycatcher (shoudai niao 绶带鸟) with its long tail looking like ribbons represents longevity due to its name having the word 'shou' being the homonym of shou (longevity) and 'dai' being the homophone of dai (代) which means generation; thus expressing the wishes for longevity for the family's generation.

==== Quail ====
A quail (anchun 鵪鶉) symbolizes courage and is a symbol of peace.

==== Wild geese ====
A wild goose (dayan 大雁 or e 鹅) symbolizes loyalty, fidelity, and marital bliss.

== Auspicious fish, reptiles, and amphibians ==
=== Fish ===
Fish are typically uses as a symbolism for wealth and abundance; the word fish yu is a homonym for the word abundance yu.

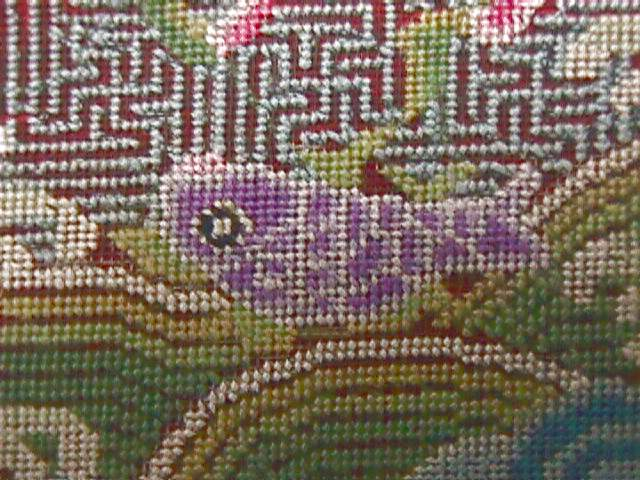

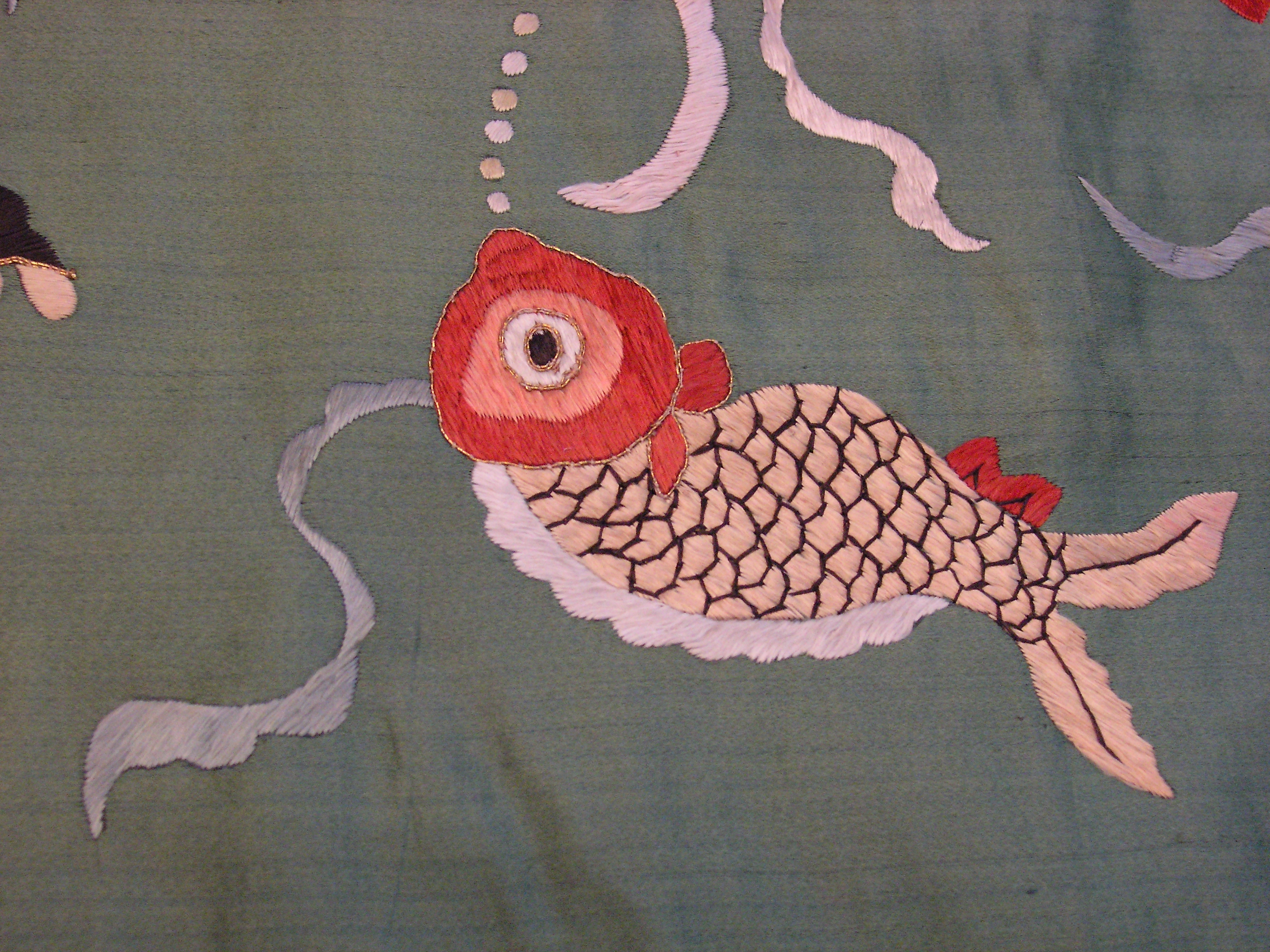

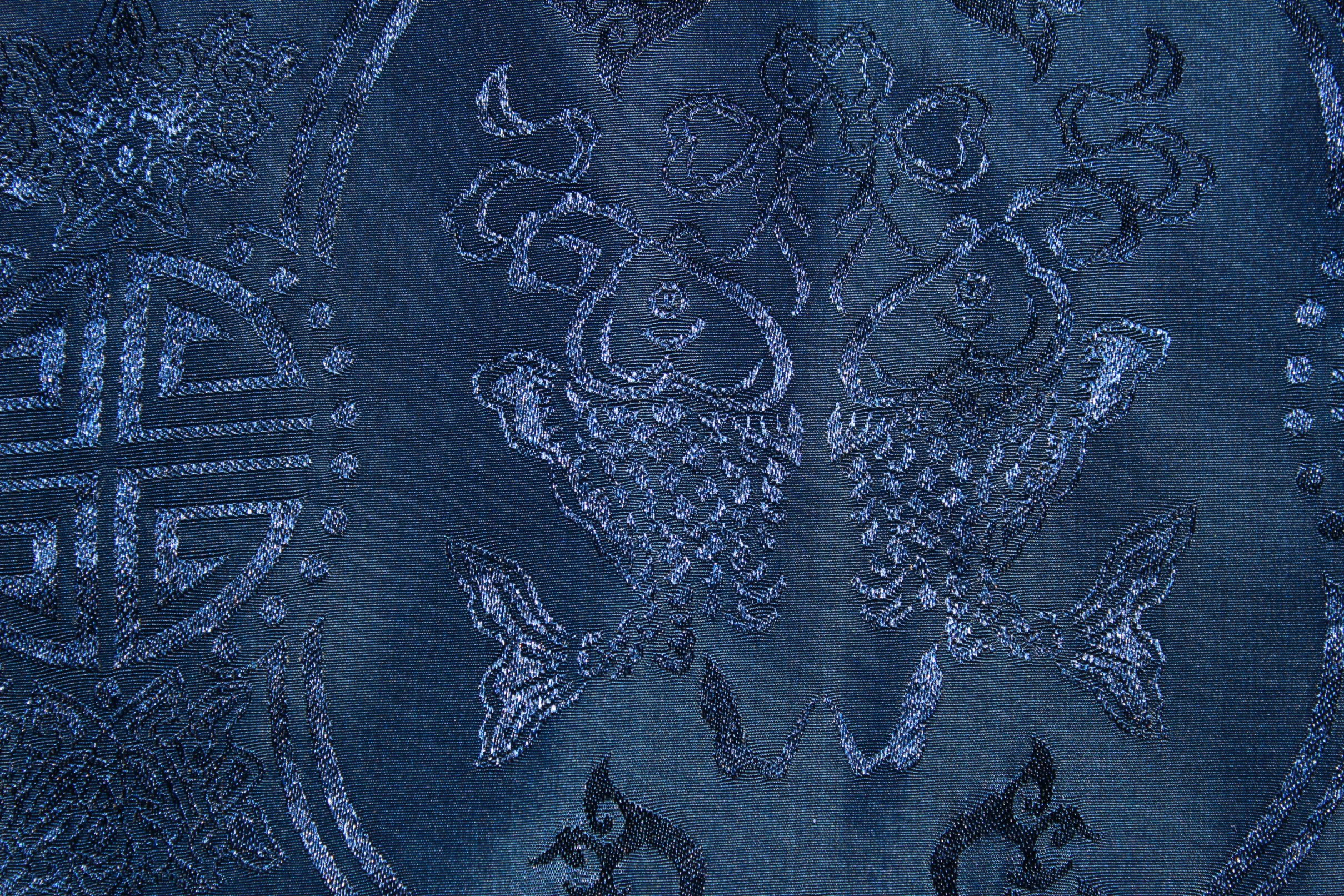

=== Reptiles ===
==== Tortoise ====
Tortoises are symbols of longevity.

== Auspicious insects ==
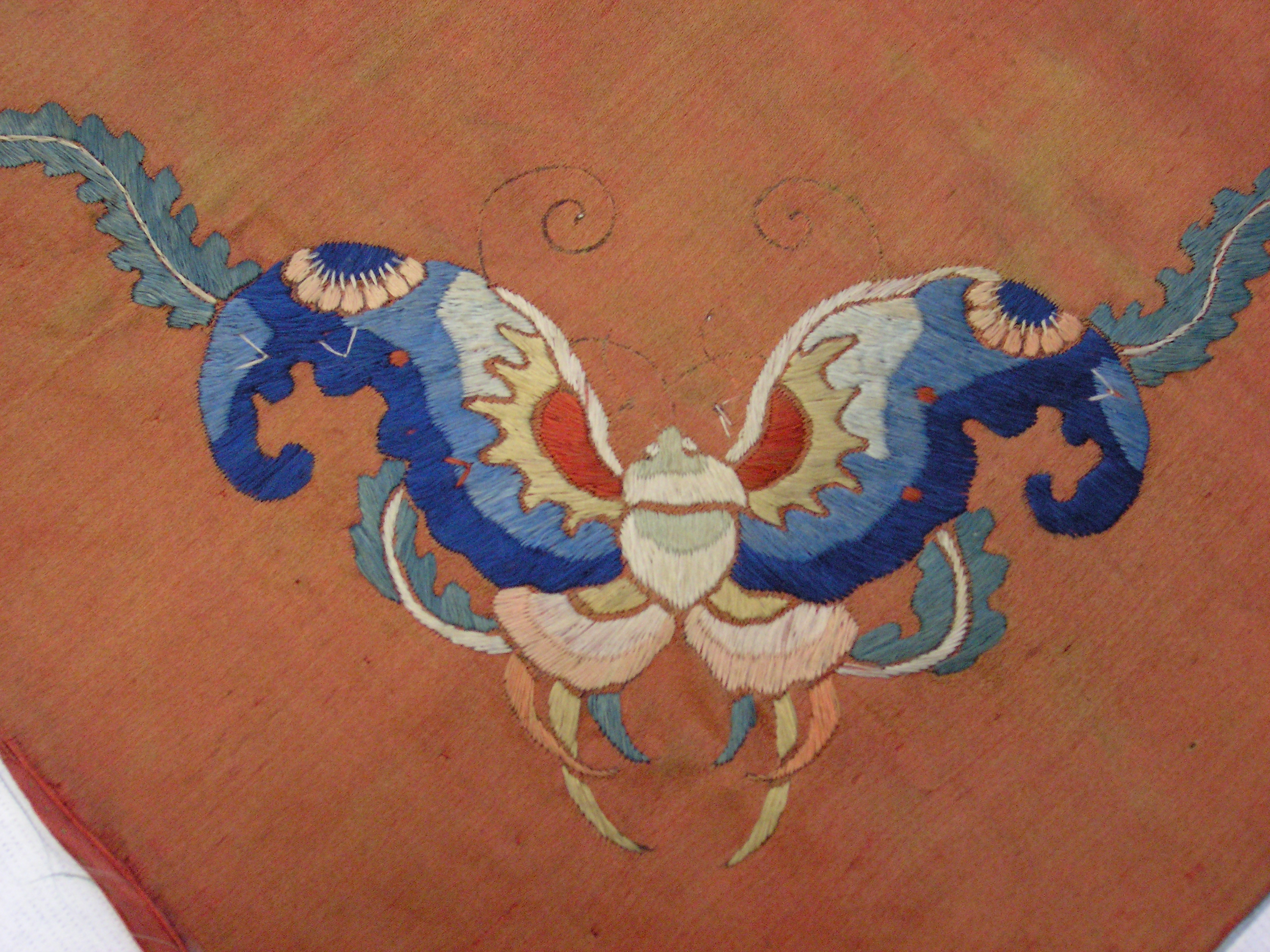
Butterfly embroidery

=== Butterflies ===
The butterfly is a symbol of conjugal happiness.

== Combination of different animal categories ==
=== Cat and butterfly ===
The combination of a cat and a butterfly symbolizes the longevity of old people.

== Chinese dragons (including python) ==
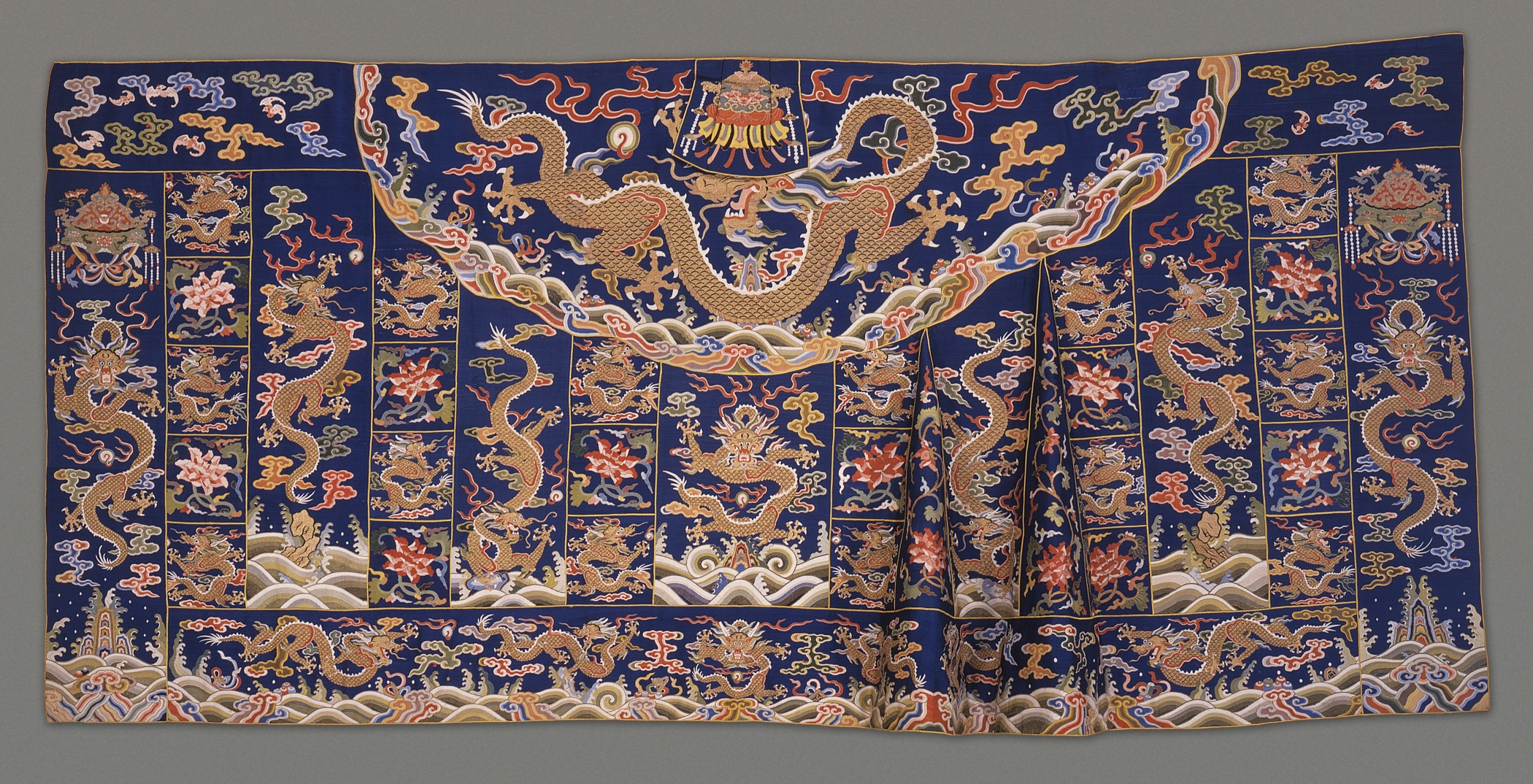
Buddhist Priest's Robe (Sengjiazhi) with dragons, Qing dynasty, Qianlong period, 1736–1795

Chinese dragons, long (simplified Chinese: 龙; traditional Chinese: 龍; pinyin: lóng), are the national totem of the Chinese people; they are the most majestic symbols and are a symbol of authority, nobleness, honour, luck and success. According to Chinese cosmology, the Heavens are divided into nine palaces; and each of these nine palaces are ruled by a dragon. These nine dragons are often depicting as either ascending to or descending from the sky; they are also the symbolism of the dynamic powers of the Universe.

Chinese dragons are crucial elements on Chinese imperial clothing and appeared on the imperial court clothing at the end of the 7th century and became the symbol of the Chinese emperors in the Song dynasty. Chinese dragons continued to be used in the Qing dynasty in the imperial and court clothing. The types of dragons and their numbers of claws were regulated and prescribed by the imperial court. When Chinese dragons are enclosed in roundels, they are referred as tuanlong (团龙); they can also be enclosed in mandarin square (buzi).

The Chinese dragons originally had three claws in the Tang and Song dynasties, but the definition of Chinese dragons in China eventually shifted, and were regulated and institutionalized. It was therefore formally established that the Chinese dragons should have 5-clawed in the Ming and Qing dynasties while the 4-clawed dragon were no longer considered to be dragons, but mang (蟒, lit. "python").

Only the Emperor of China and some members of the imperial family were allowed to wear five-clawed dragons motifs which matched with the definition of Chinese dragons at those times. Other people wore other forms of dragon-like creatures, which were no longer considered as being Chinese dragons according to the contemporary standard. According to Shen Defu, a bureaucrat in the Ming dynasty, "the mang robe [蟒服, lit. "python robe"] is a garment with an image close to a dragon, similar to the dragon robe of the top authority (the emperor), except for the deduction of one claw". Clothing with 4-clawed Chinese dragon-like creatures were mangfu, feiyufu and douniufu; feiyu and douniu have additional specific characteristics which differ them from both the mang and the long. When the Ming dynasty court would bestow robes upon other chieftains, they would bestow four-clawed dragons; (Note: e.g. Manchu chieftains in 1522 received a mangfu) lesser princes, nobles and senior court officials of the Ming dynasty were also prescribed mang.

=== Xinglong/ travelling dragon/ moving dragon ===
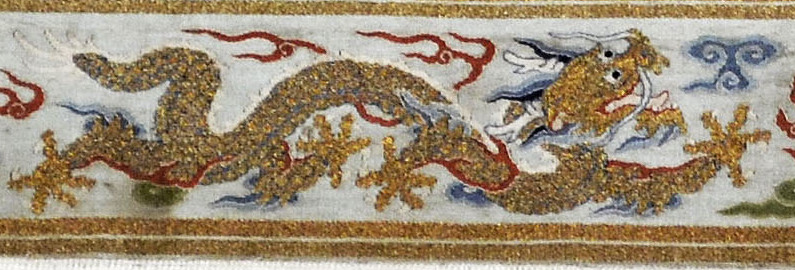
Xinlong

Xinlong (行龙) are curled body dragons that run horizontally with a sideways facing body and feet pointed downward, giving the appearance that they are walking or running.

=== Dragon playing with (flaming) pearl or ball ===
A common motif used in clothing and other arts products is the dragon playing with flaming pearls (or balls), which appeared during the second half of the first 1st millennium AD. The flaming ball or ball represents either the sun or the moon; it is sometimes referred as the "day or night shining pearl".

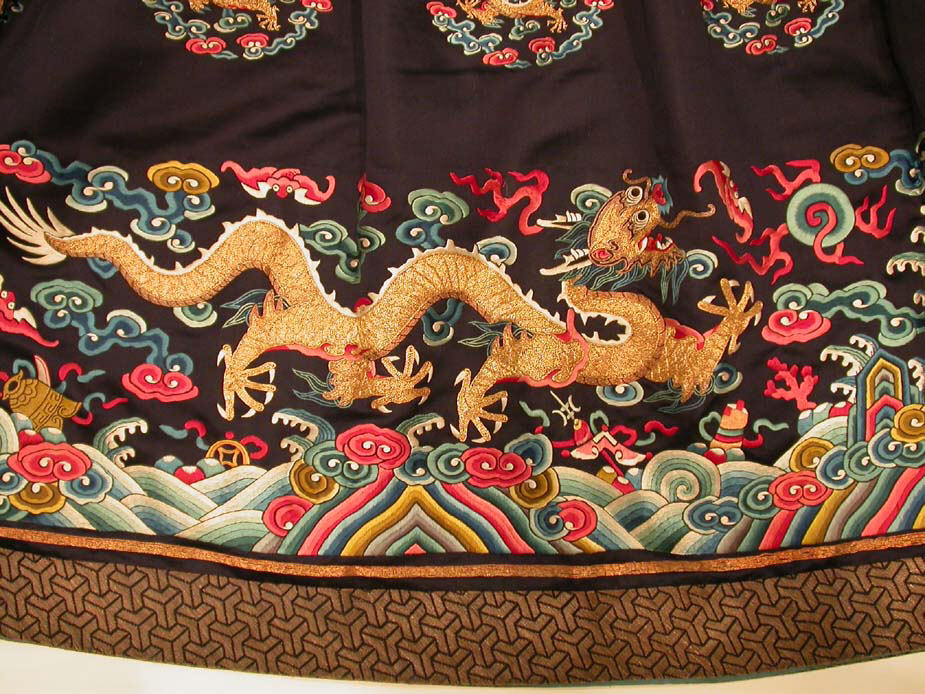
Travelling dragon (xinglong) chasing after a flaming pearl

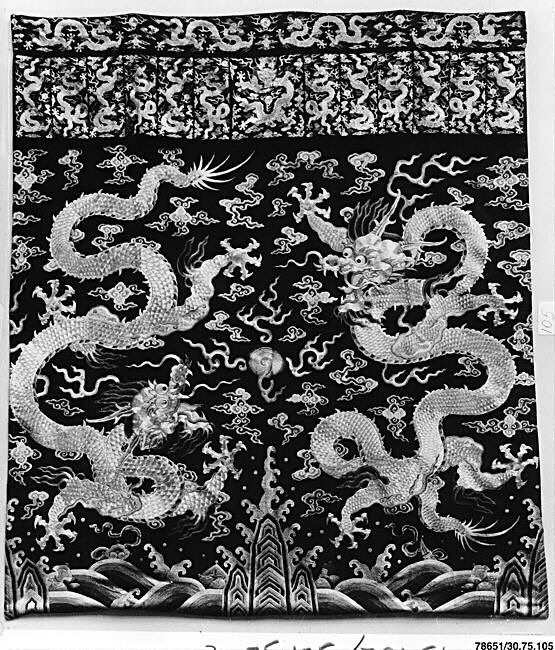
Unenclosed opposing dragons chasing after a pearl

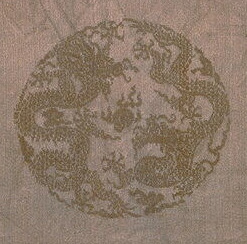
Opposing dragons (one ascending and one descending) chasing after flaming pearl enclosed in a roundel

=== Lilong/ standing dragon ===
Lilong (立龙), or standing dragon, is a dragon with curved standing body, with its head in profile (facing a side). The legs are splayed limbs and well distributed on 4 sides.

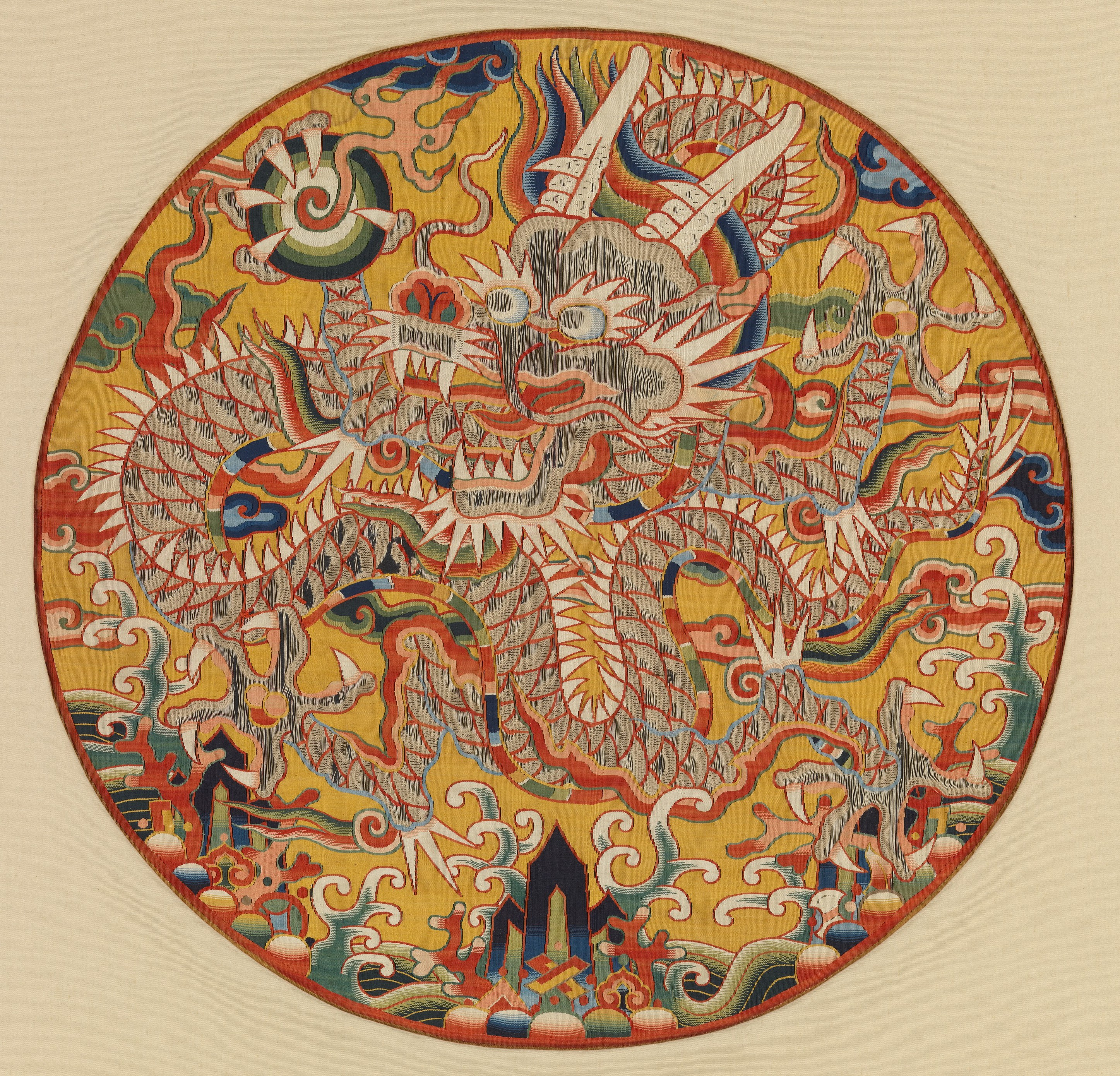

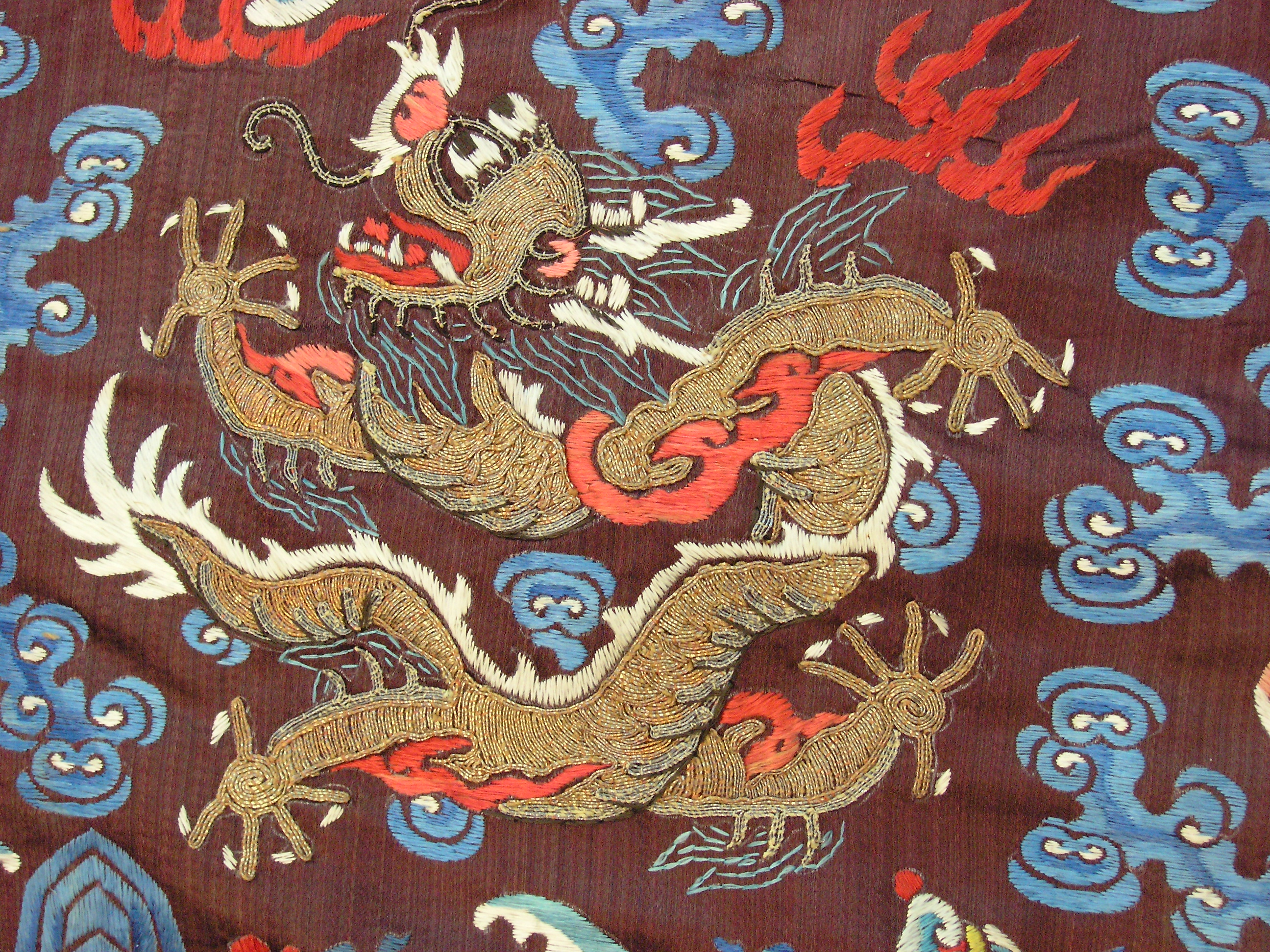

=== Sitting dragon/ front-facing dragon ===
Sitting dragon (zhenglong 正龙) or front-facing dragonis a dragon with a curved body with its head facing front with splayed limbs. The legs are well distributed on 4 sides. The body have 7 bends.

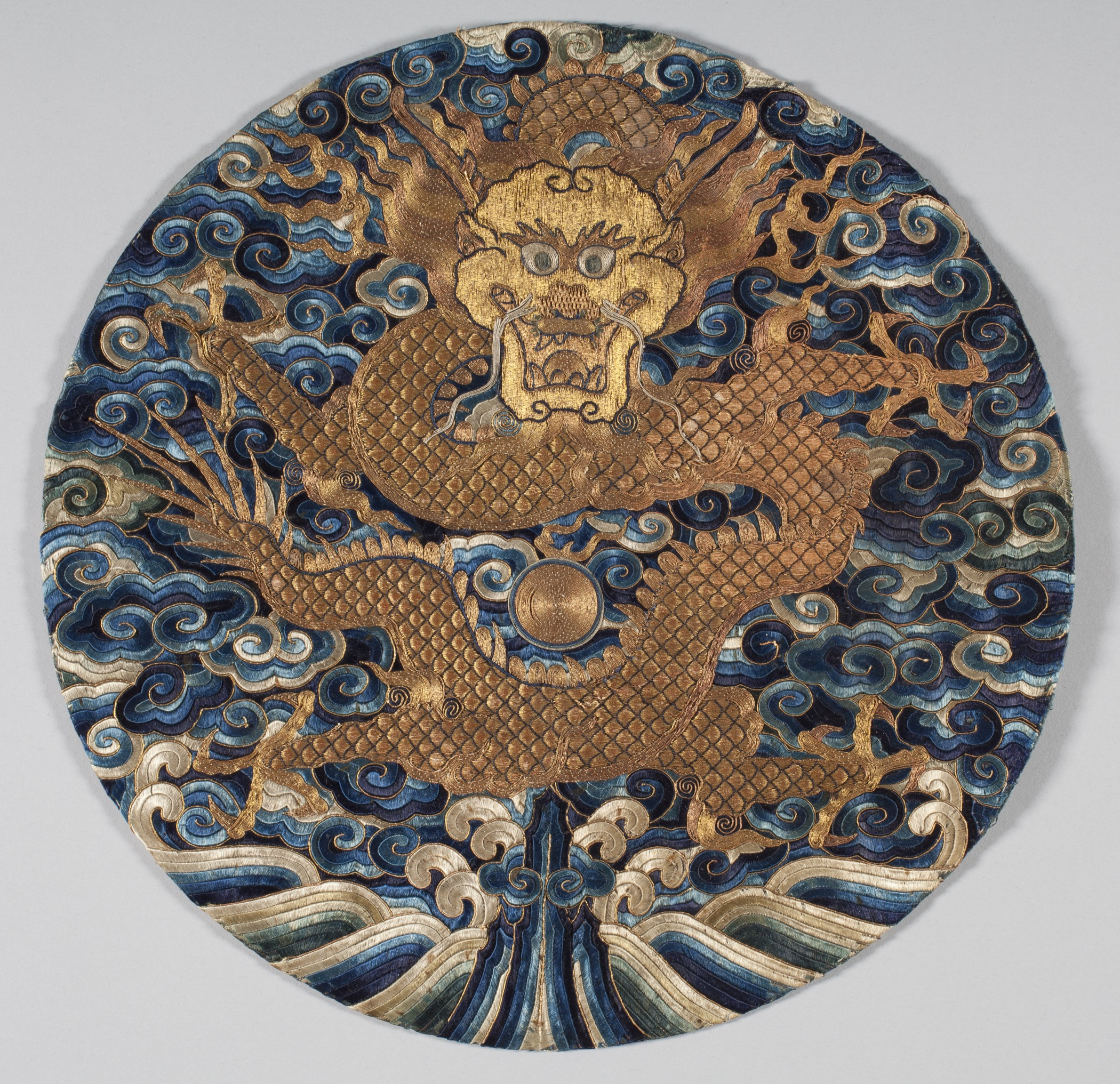
Zhengman (4-clawed dragon) in a roundel

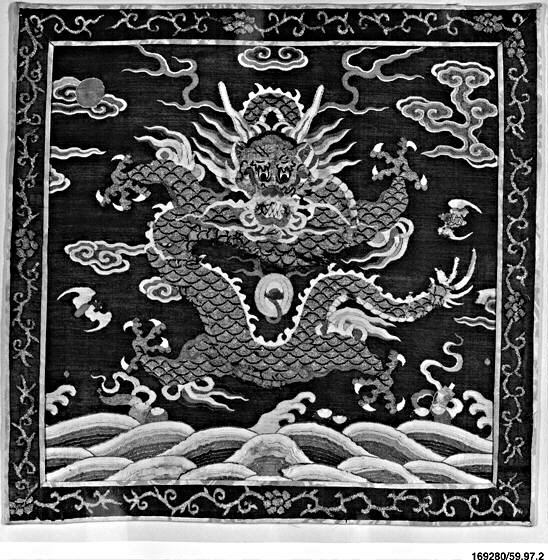
Zhengmang in a buzi

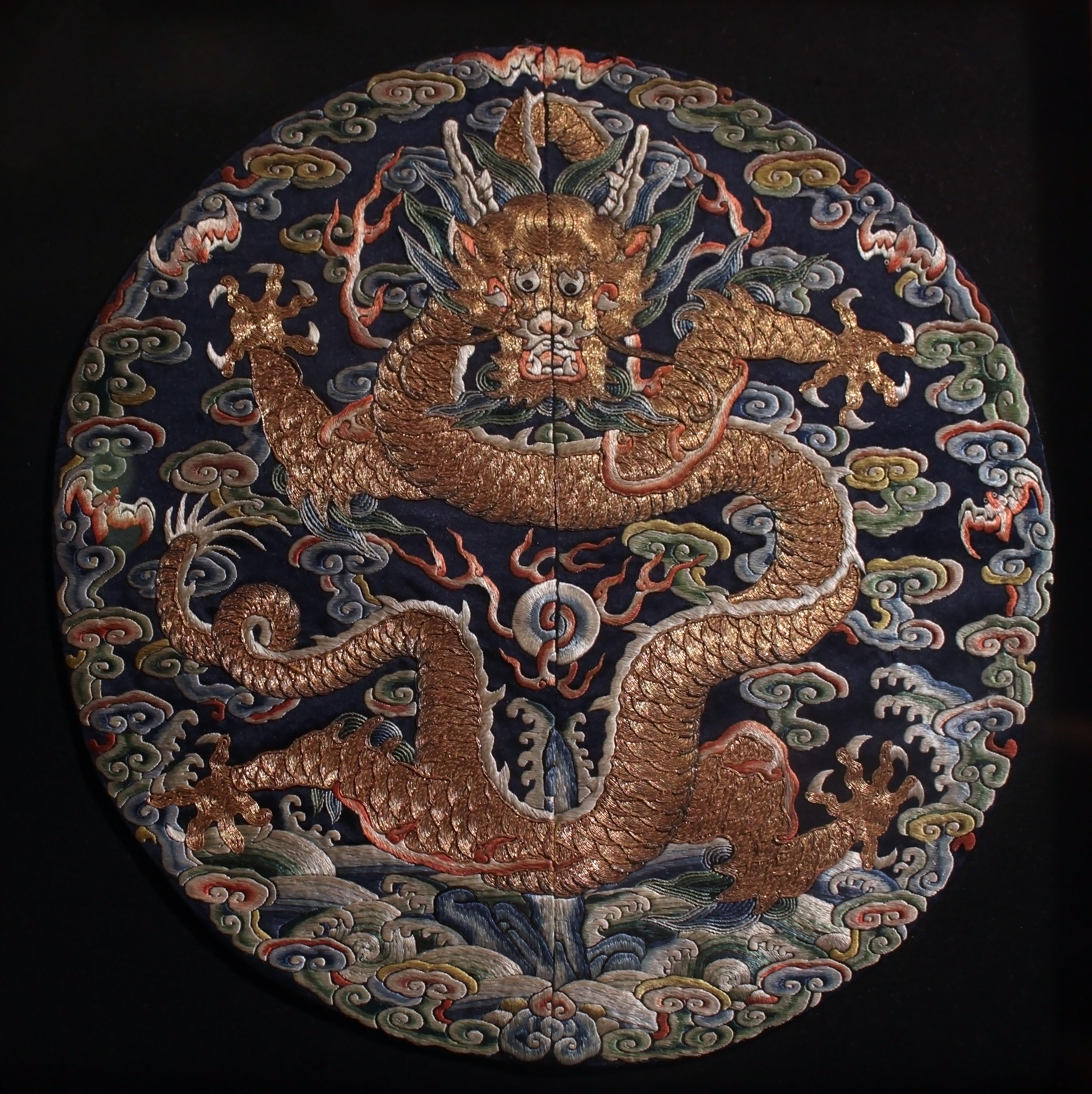
Zhenglong (5-clawed) in a roundel

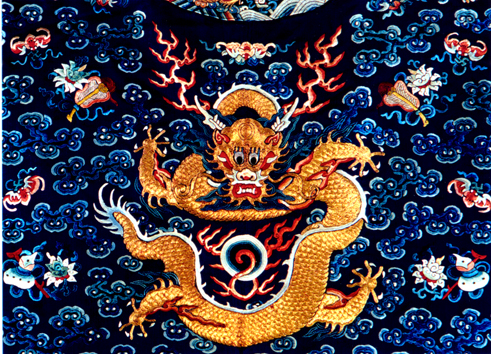
Unenclosed zhenglong

=== Jianglong/ descending dragon ===
Jianglong (降龙) or descending dragons are curling dragons which appear to be descending vertically.

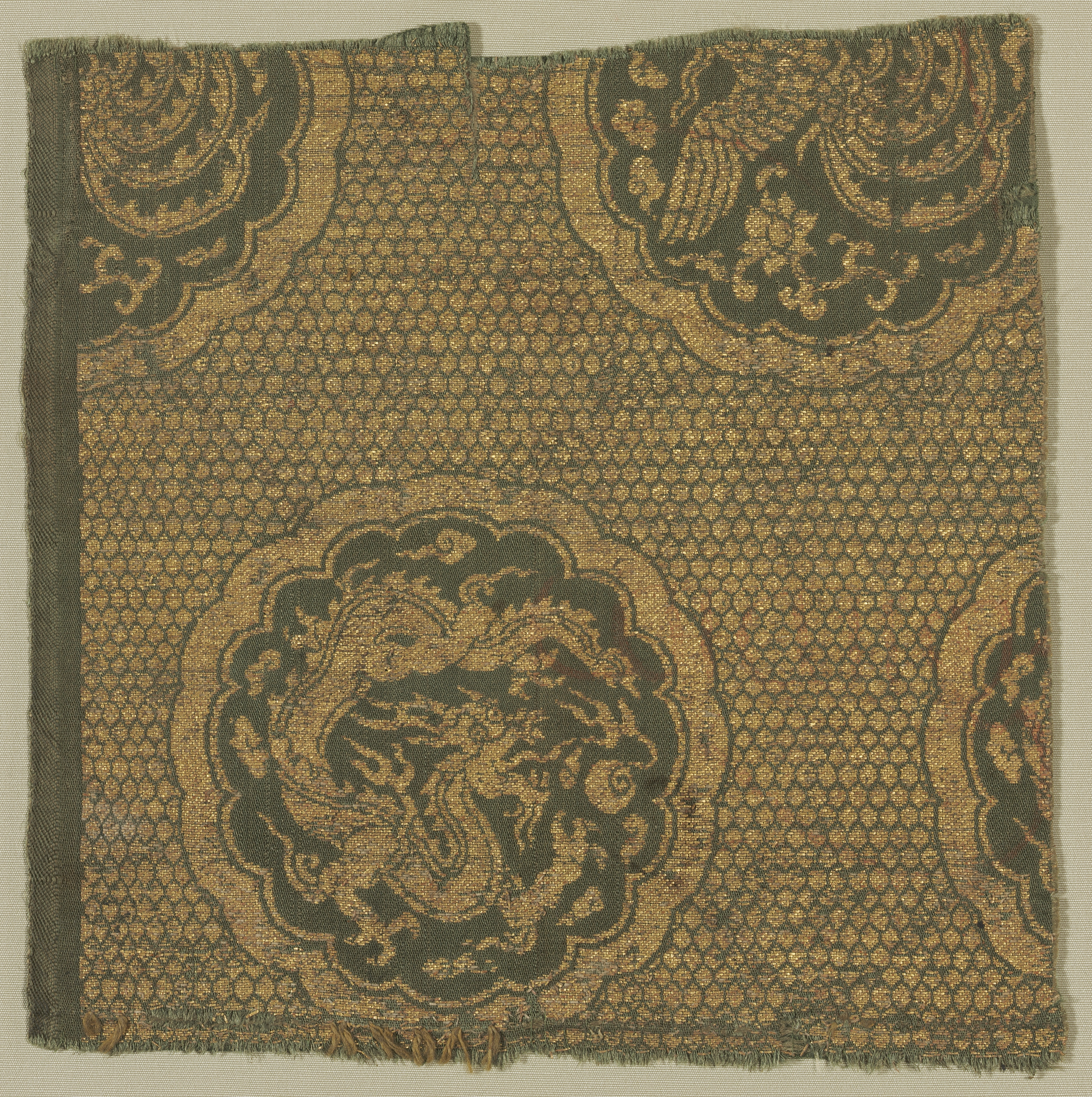
Three-clawed jianglong in roundel, Yuan dynasty

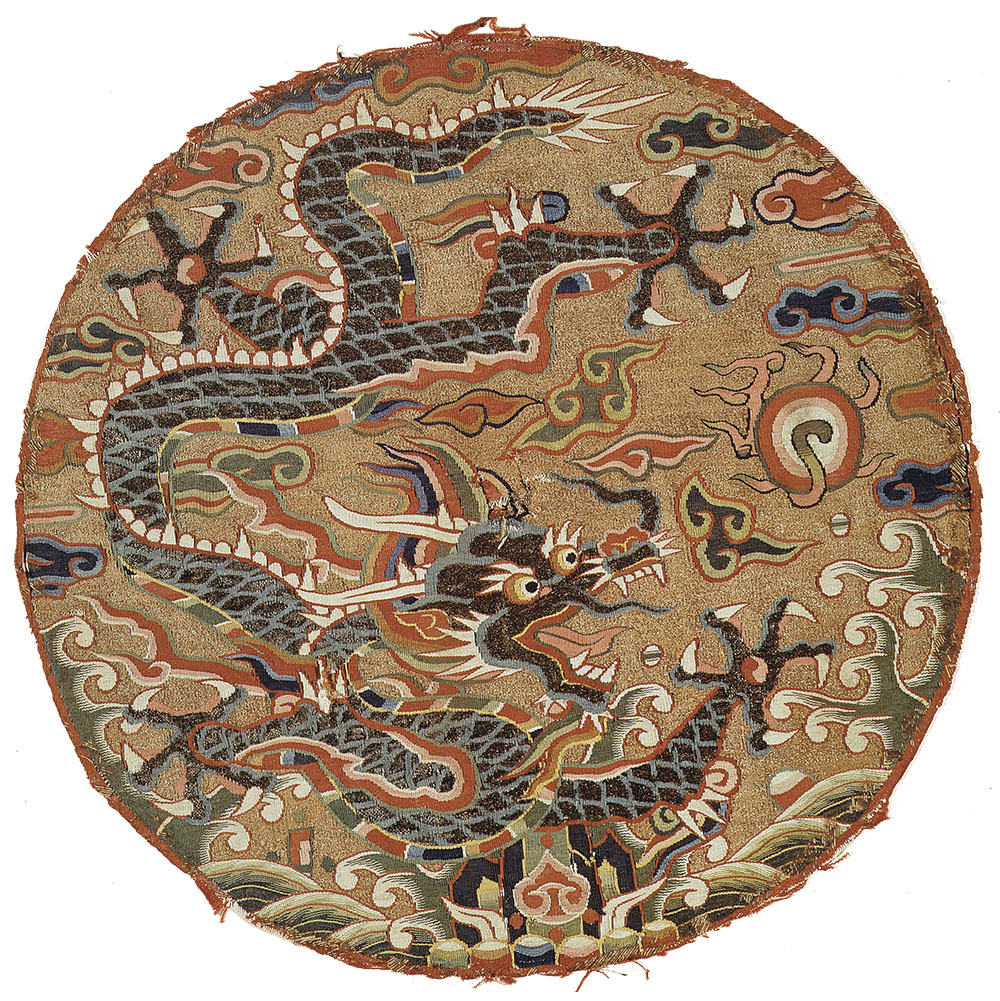
Jianglong enclosed in a roundel, Ming dynasty

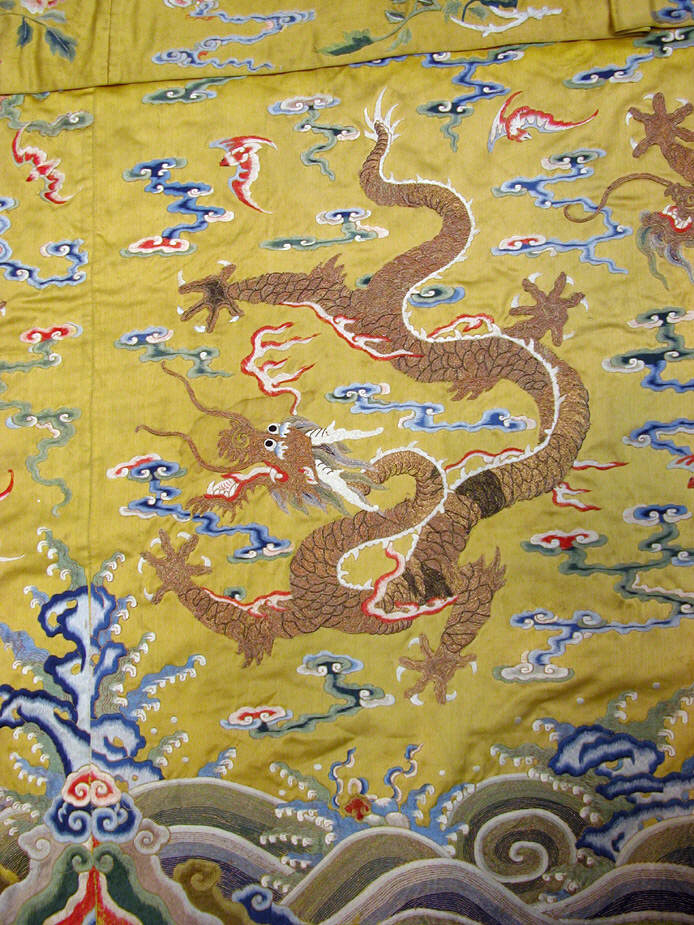
Unenclosed jianglong, Qing dynasty

=== Shenglong/ ascending dragon ===
Shenglong (升龙) or ascending dragons (爬龍) are curling dragons which appear to be ascending vertically.

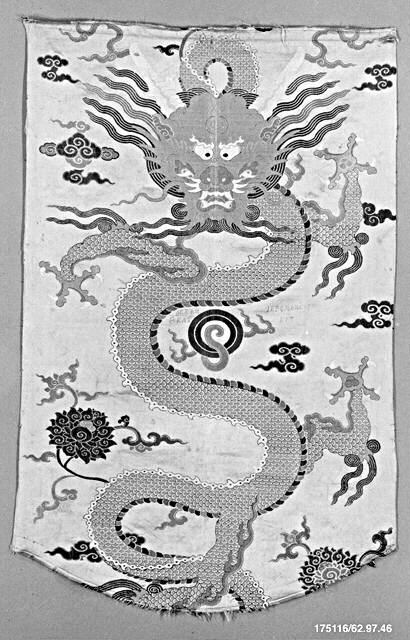

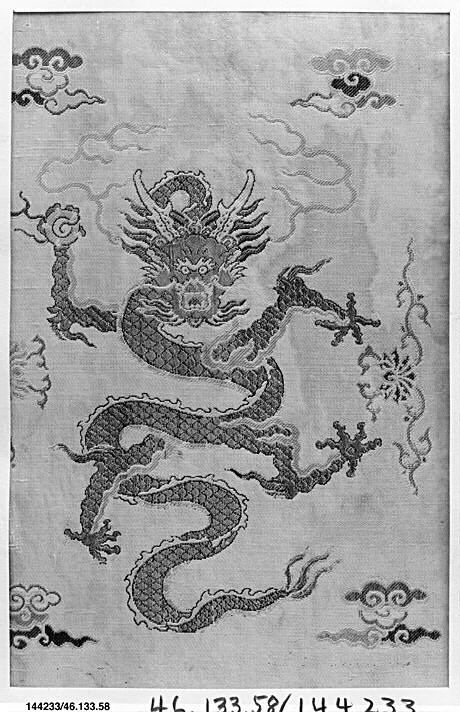

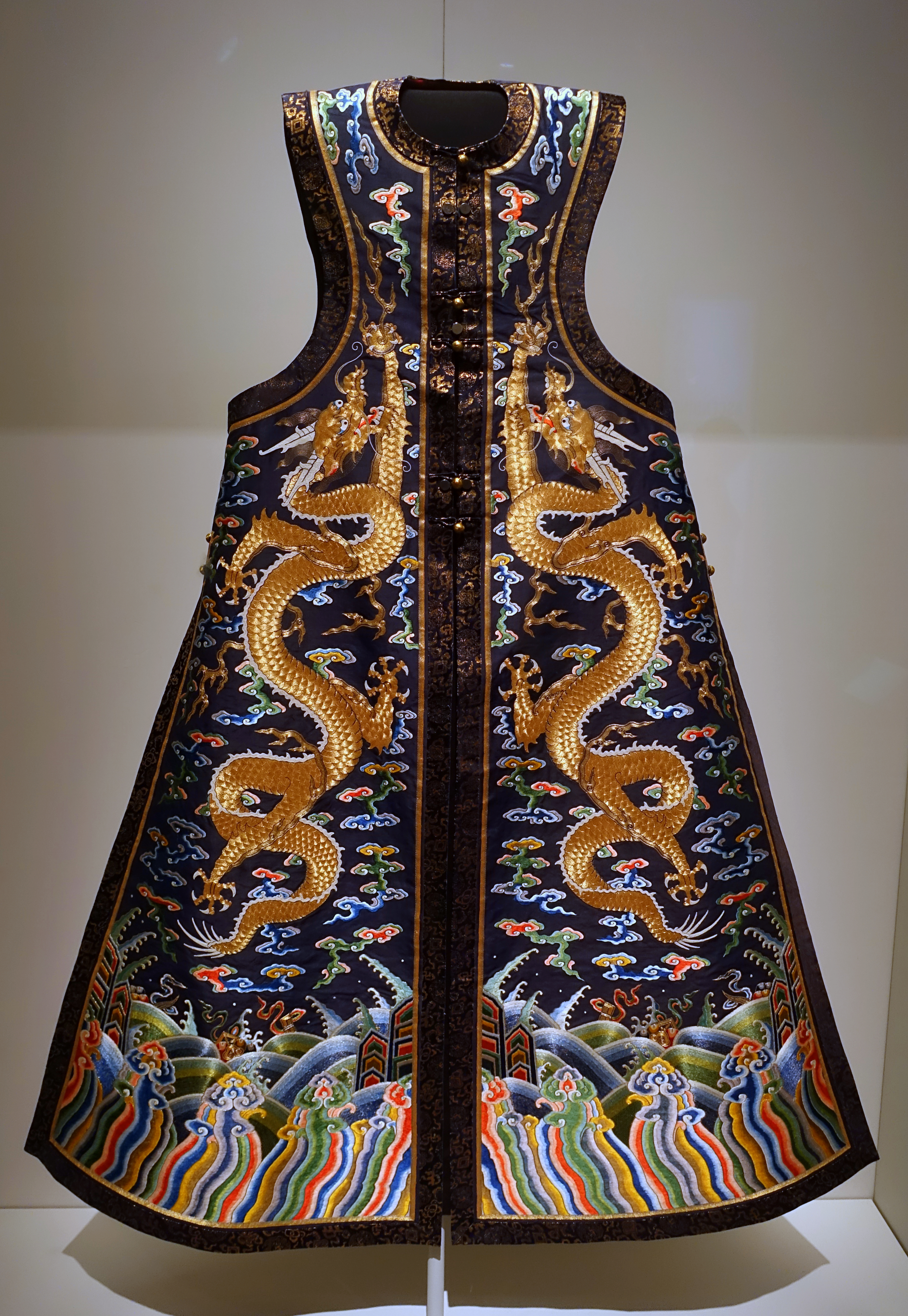

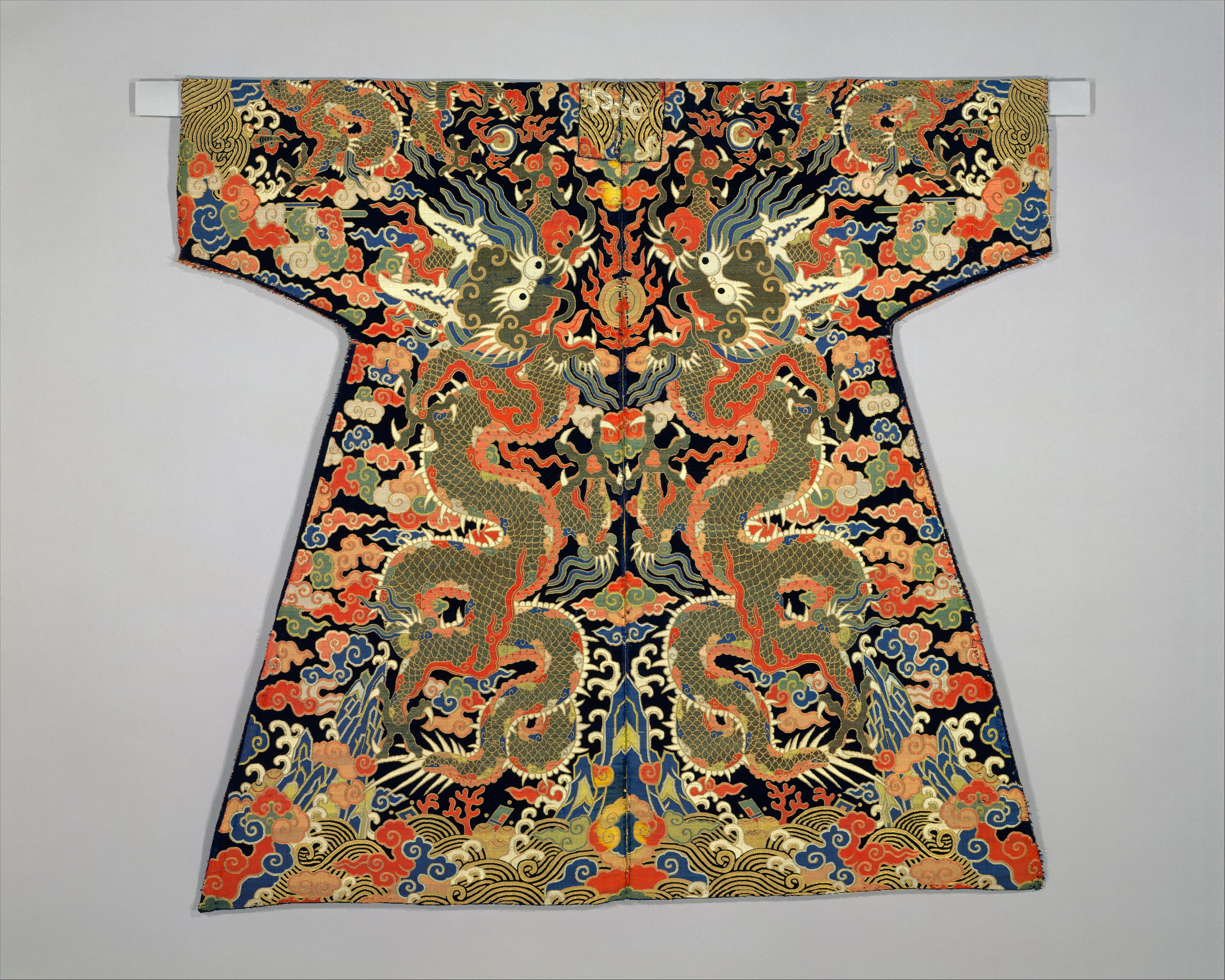

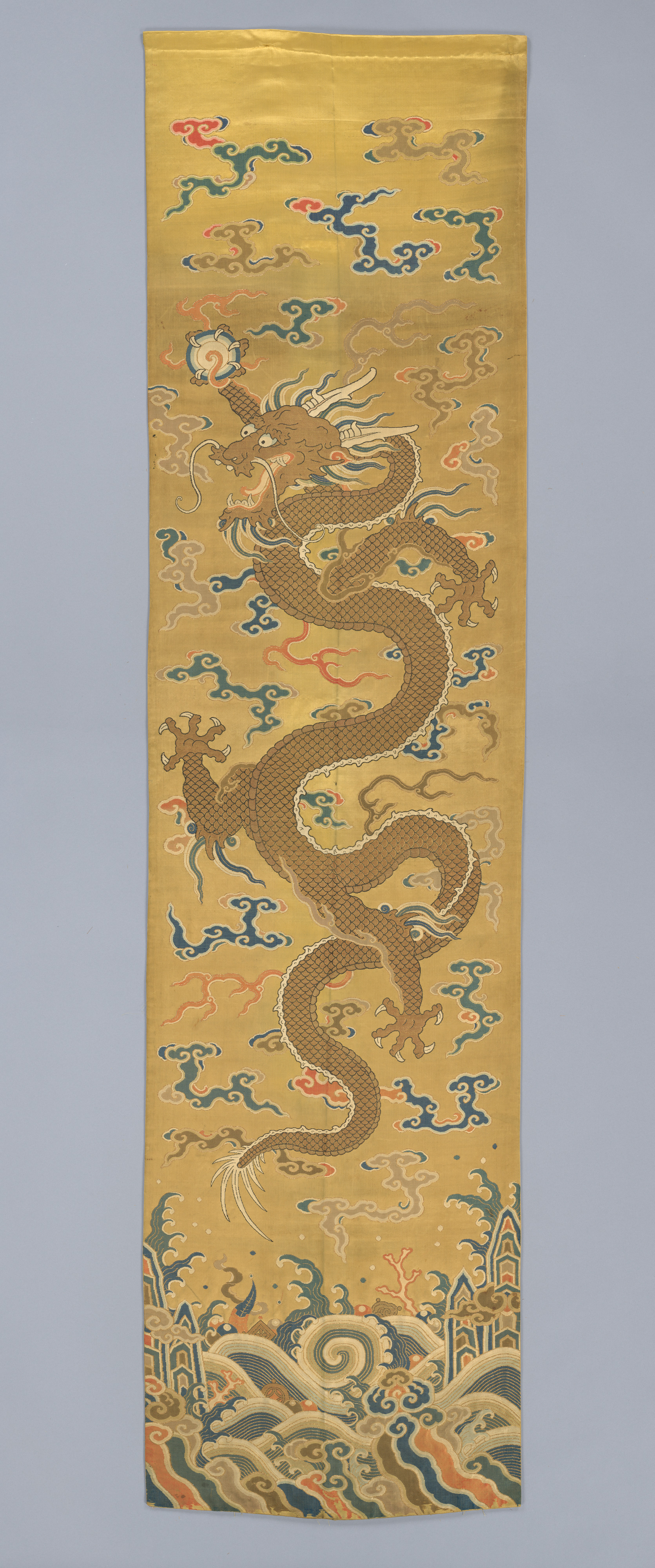

=== Confronted dragons ===
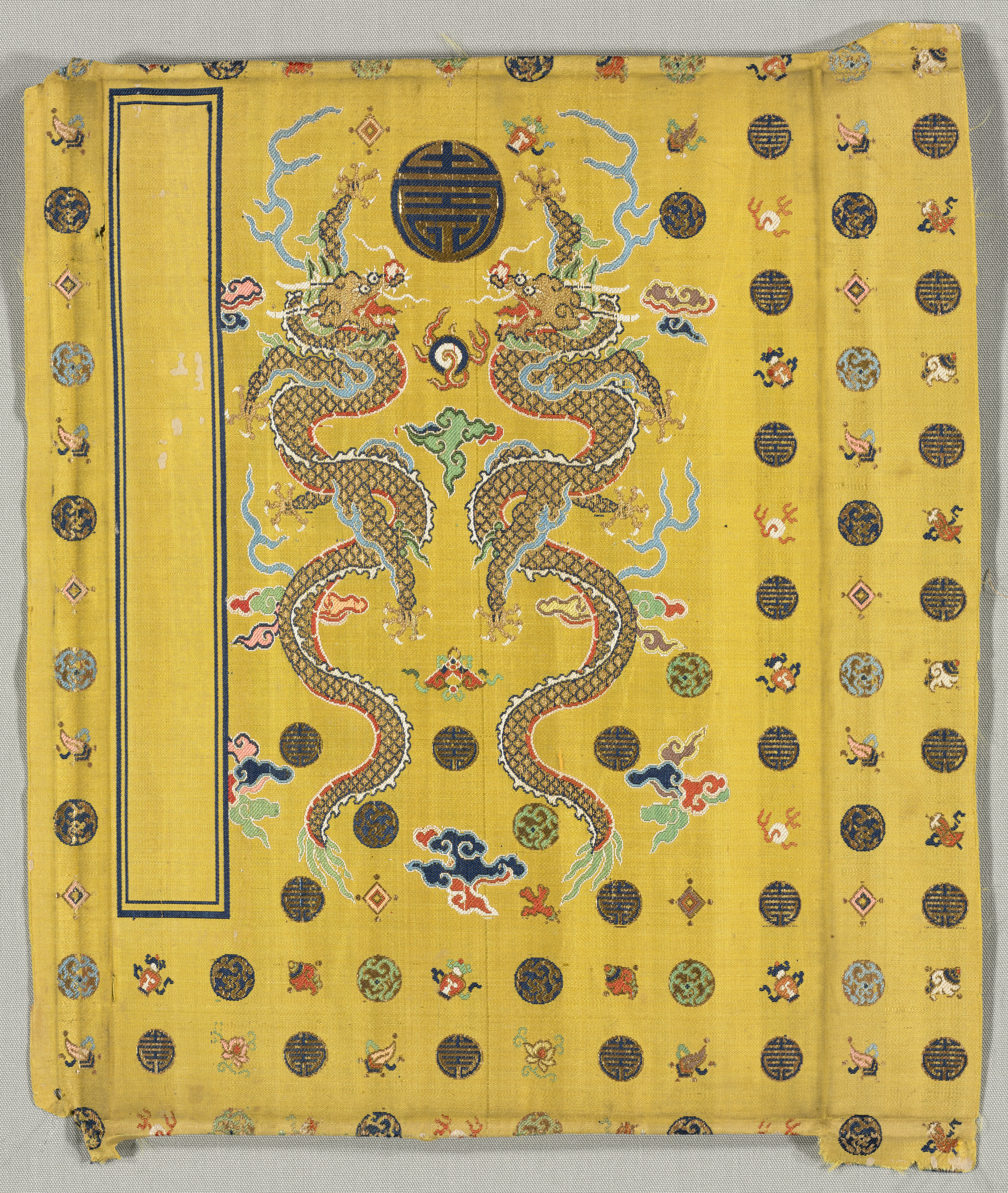
Confronted ascending dragons, book cover, 18th century

Confronted dragons are two dragons facing toward each other and moving toward the same direction.

== Fenghuang / phoenix ==
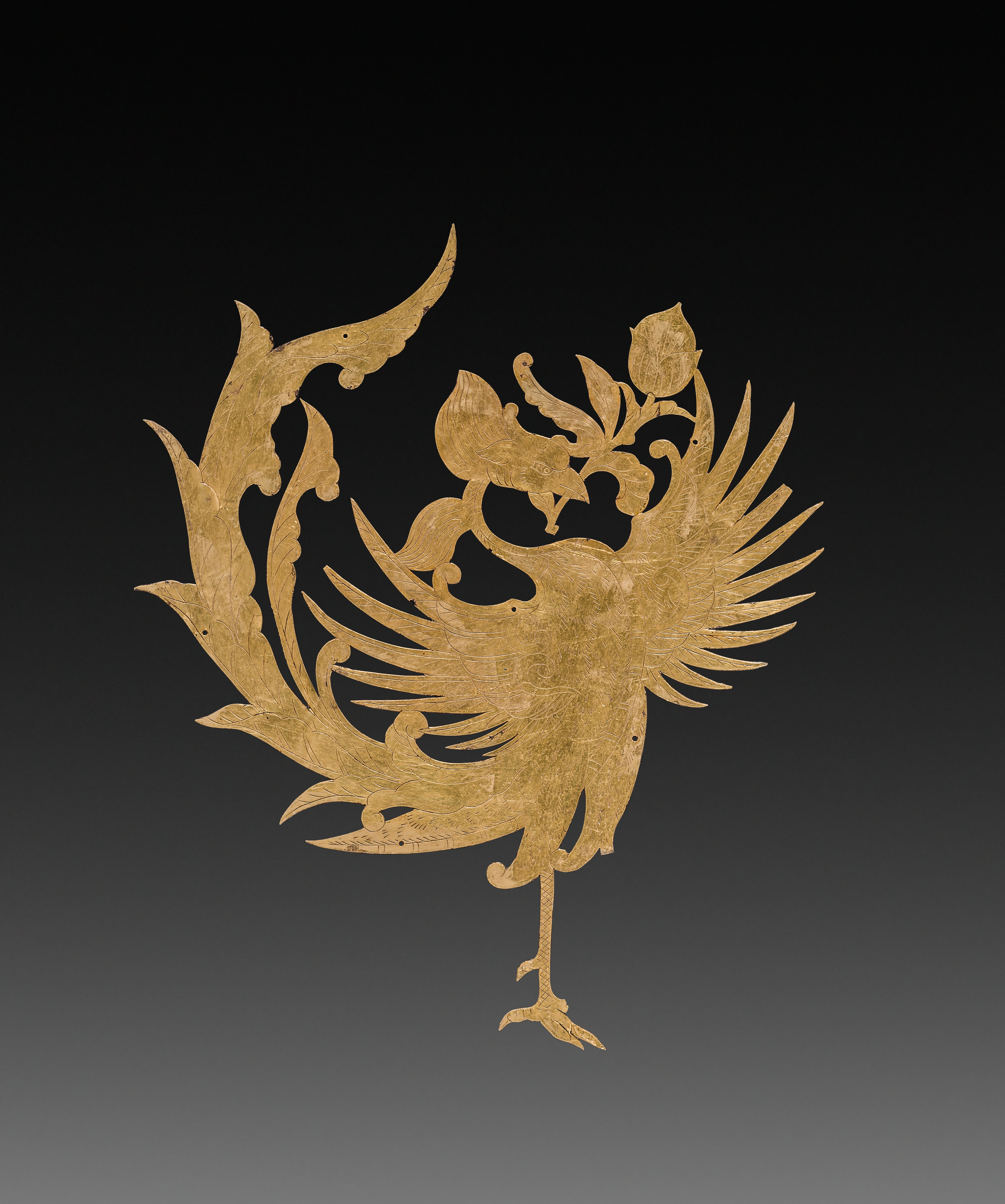
Fenghuang, Tang dynasty

Fenghuang symbolizes everything good and everything beautiful, peace, good fortune, and feminine beauty. The five virtues of the fenghuang are righteousness, humanity, chastity, fairness and sincerity.

It is often found on the clothing of women. The fenghuang is also the symbol of the empress and represent the yin principle in the Yin and Yang philosophical concept. In Imperial China, the fenghuang was only embroidered on the clothing of the empresses.

=== Double phoenix ===
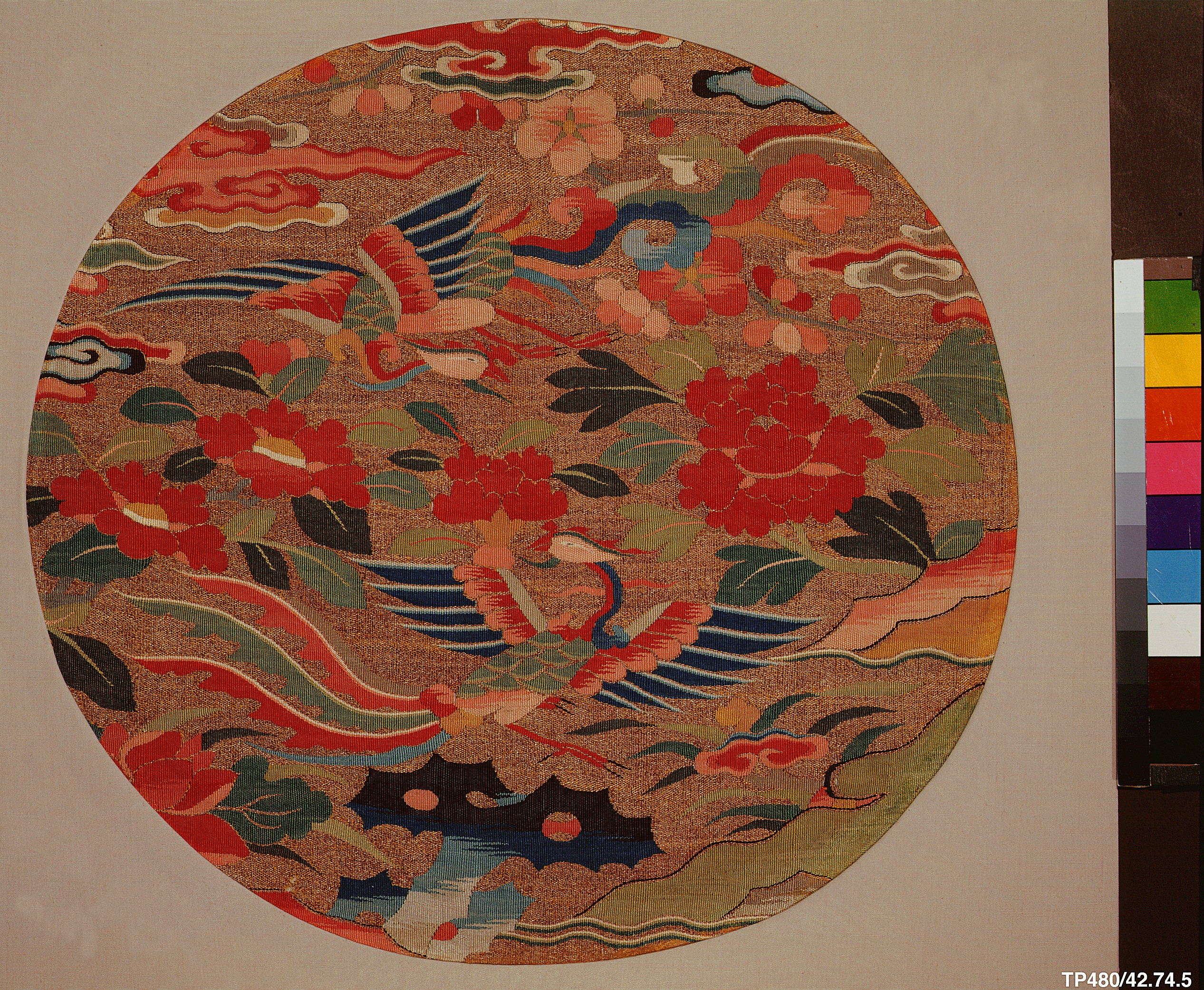
Circular textile with double phoenix, rank badge, Ming dynasty, 16–17th century

In the Ming dynasty, double phoenix were used in the rank badges were used by female member of the imperial household.

== Longfei fengwu/ Flying dragon and Dancing phoenix ==
Longfei fengwu (Chinese: 龙飞凤舞; lit. 'Flying dragon and dancing phoenix') is an auspicious ornaments which symbolizes marital bliss. In the context of a traditional Chinese wedding, the Long, Chinese dragons, and Feng, Chinese phoenix, represent the groom and the bride respectively. The Longfei fengwu can be used to embroider Chinese cloth shoes, such as xiuhuaxie.

== Qilin ==
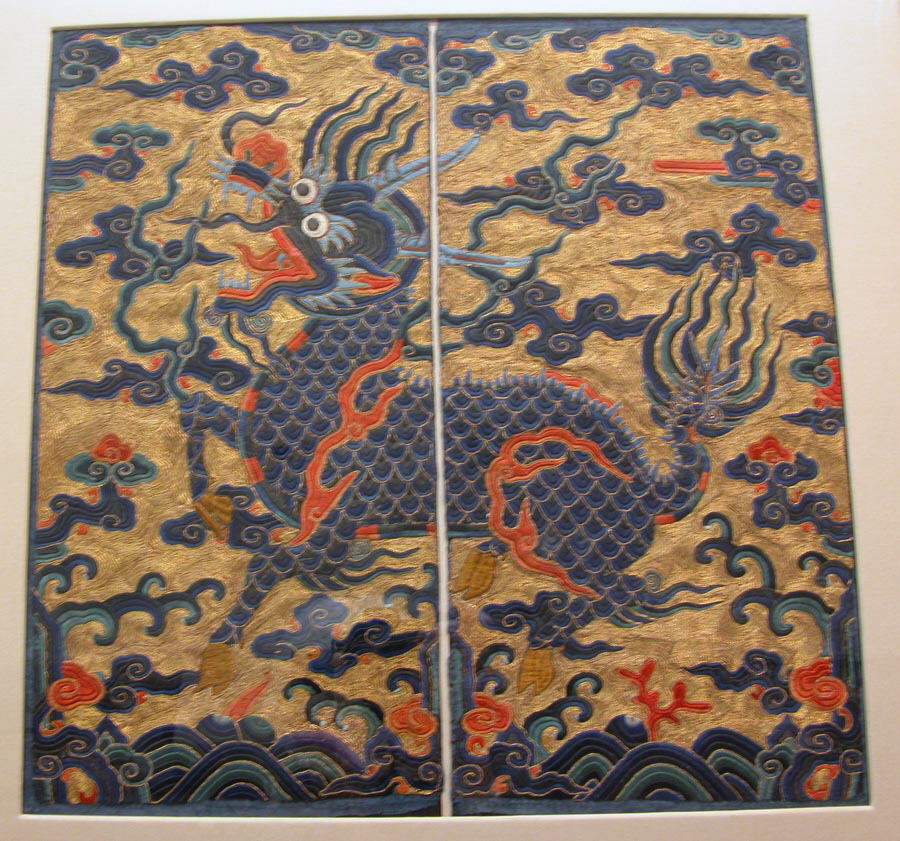
Qilin in a buzi, Qing dynasty, 17th century

Qilin symbolizes good luck for an empire; it is also the symbol of virtue and perfection. Prior to 1662, qilin was used to decorate clothing of the nobles.

After the 1662, the qilin was used to decorate the mandarin square (buzi) of the military officials of the 1st rank.

== Sun crow ==
=== Sanzuwu/ Three-legged crow ===
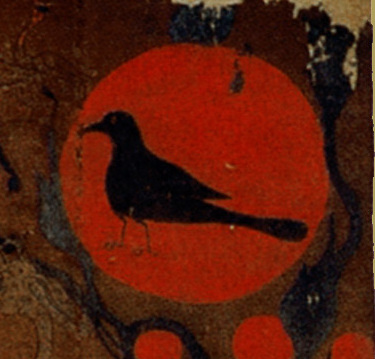
Sun crow (Erzuwu, two-legged crow), textile, Western Han dynasty

According to Chinese legends and mythology, the sanzuwu lived on the sun and was perceived as the envoy who operated the sun; since the ancient Chinese people worshipped the sun, the sanzuwu was worshipped as a symbol of happiness and comfort. The sanzuwu is one of the Twelve Ornaments, which adorn the Emperor's imperial robe.

== List of Chinese characters used in textile and clothing ==
Textiles and clothes in China could be decorated with auspicious Chinese characters.

=== Fu ===
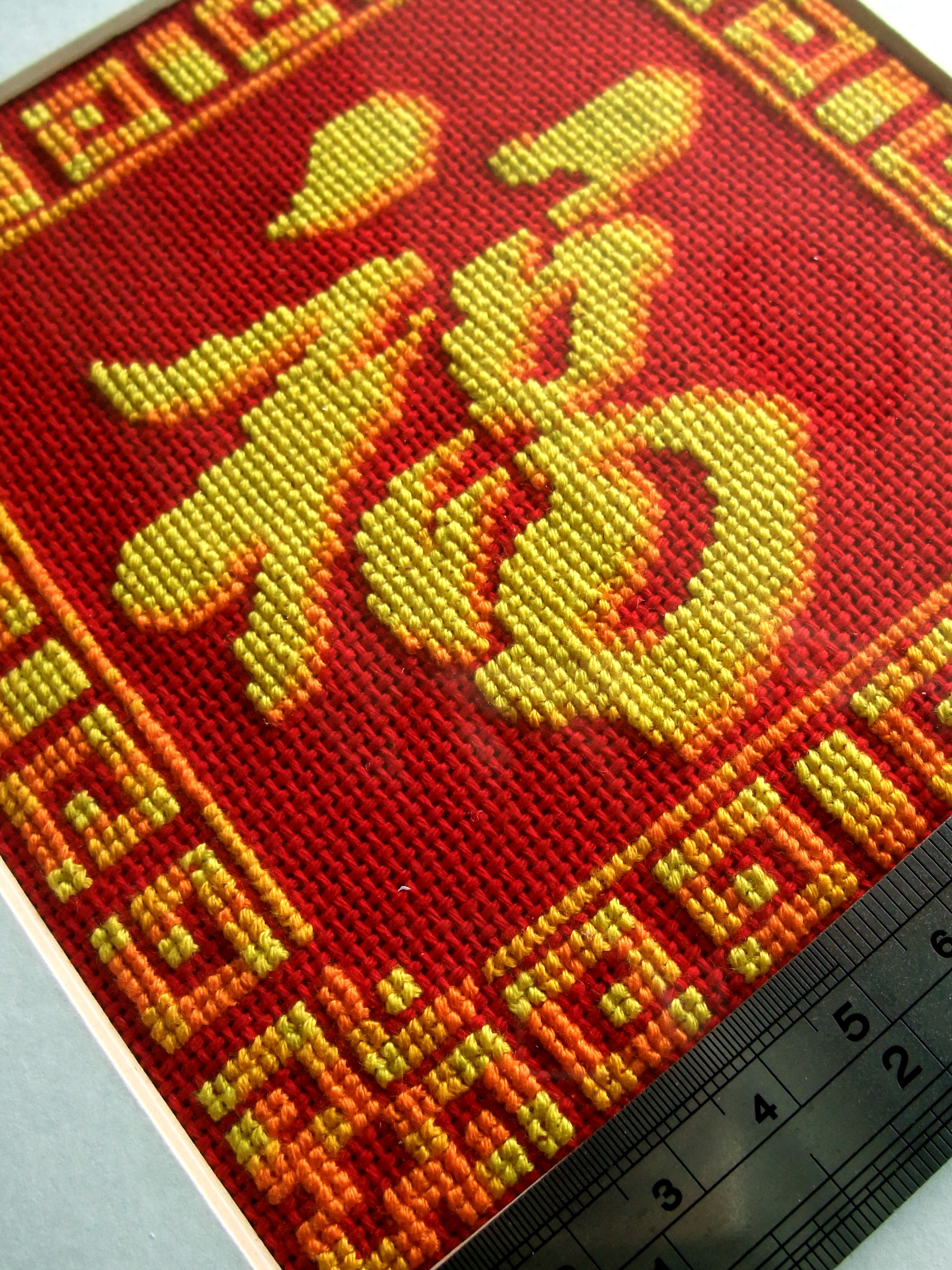
Fu character on textile

Fu (福) means fortune or blessing.

=== Ji ===
Ji (吉) means good luck. Inscriptions such as Ji (吉) and daji (大吉) have appeared very early on in ancient China and even appeared on unearthed oracle bones. The character ji could be used to decorate dragon robes in the Qing dynasty.

=== Shou ===
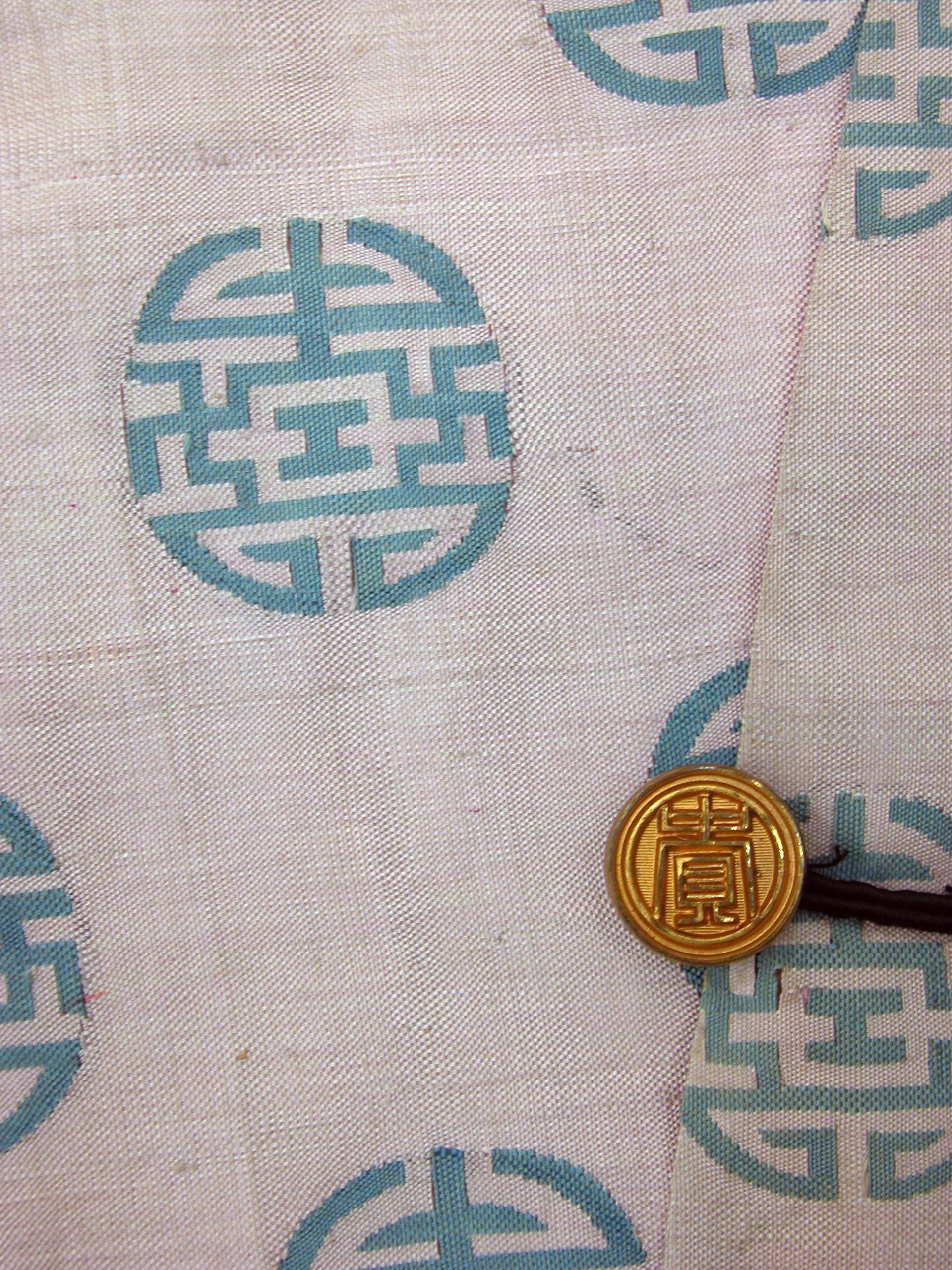
Stylized character shou with two wan symbols on a woman's sleeveless jacket, early 20th century

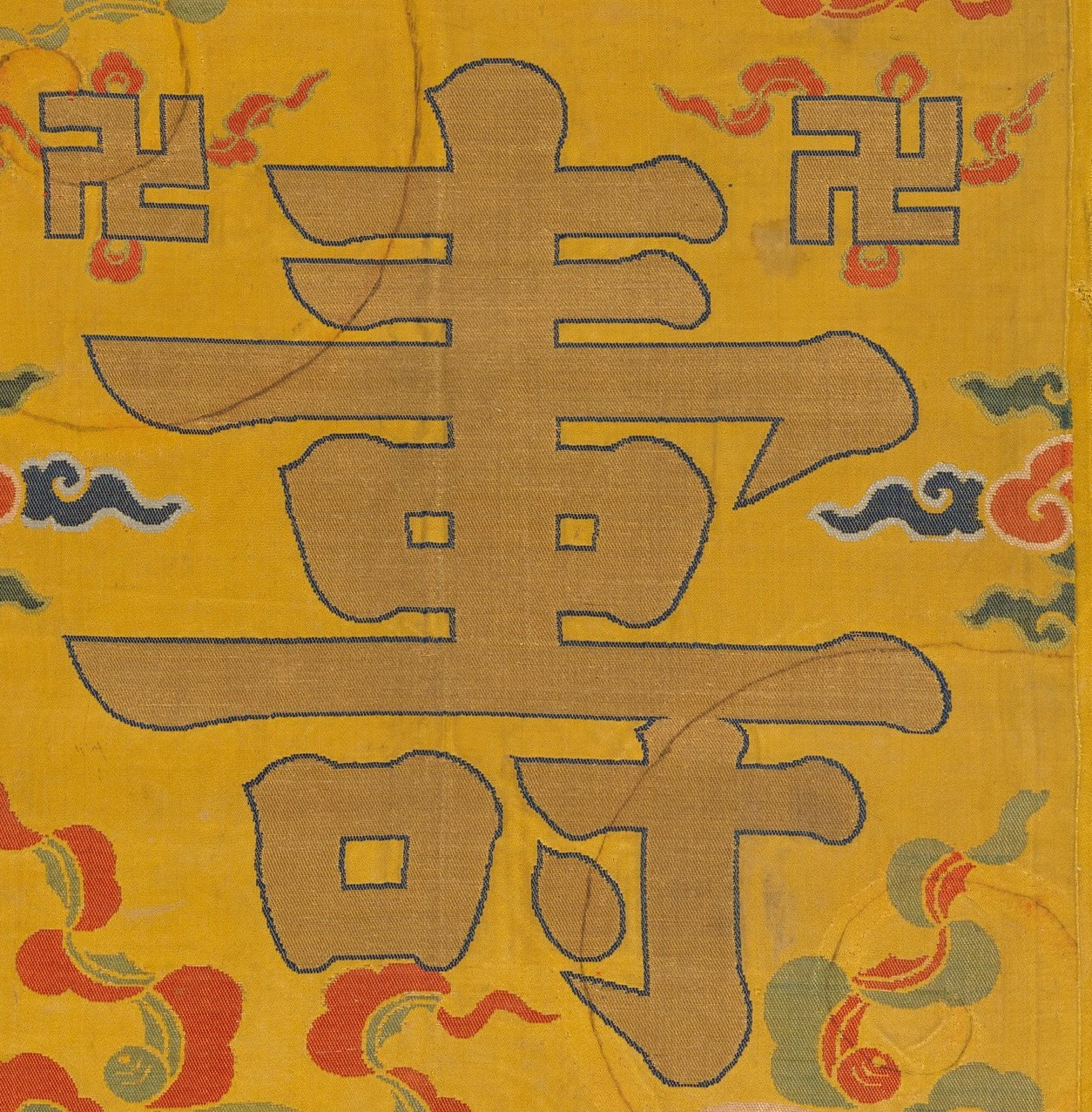
Chinese character shou with two wan characters floating over it, textile on brocaded silk satin, 17th century

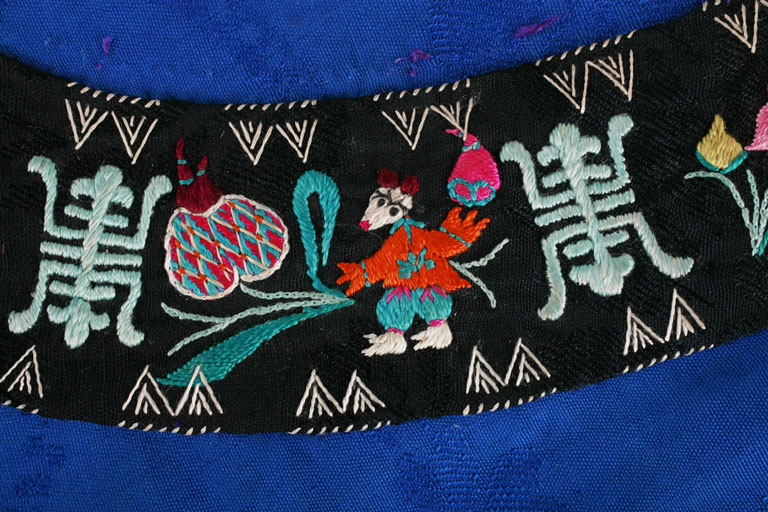
Stylized Chinese character shou, a symbol of longevity, on an embroidered infant undergarment, between 1900 and 1950

Shou《壽》means longevity. The stylized character of shou can also be used to decorate women's garments.

The Chinese character shou can also be combined with Chinese character wan, written as《卐》or《卍》.

=== Wan ===
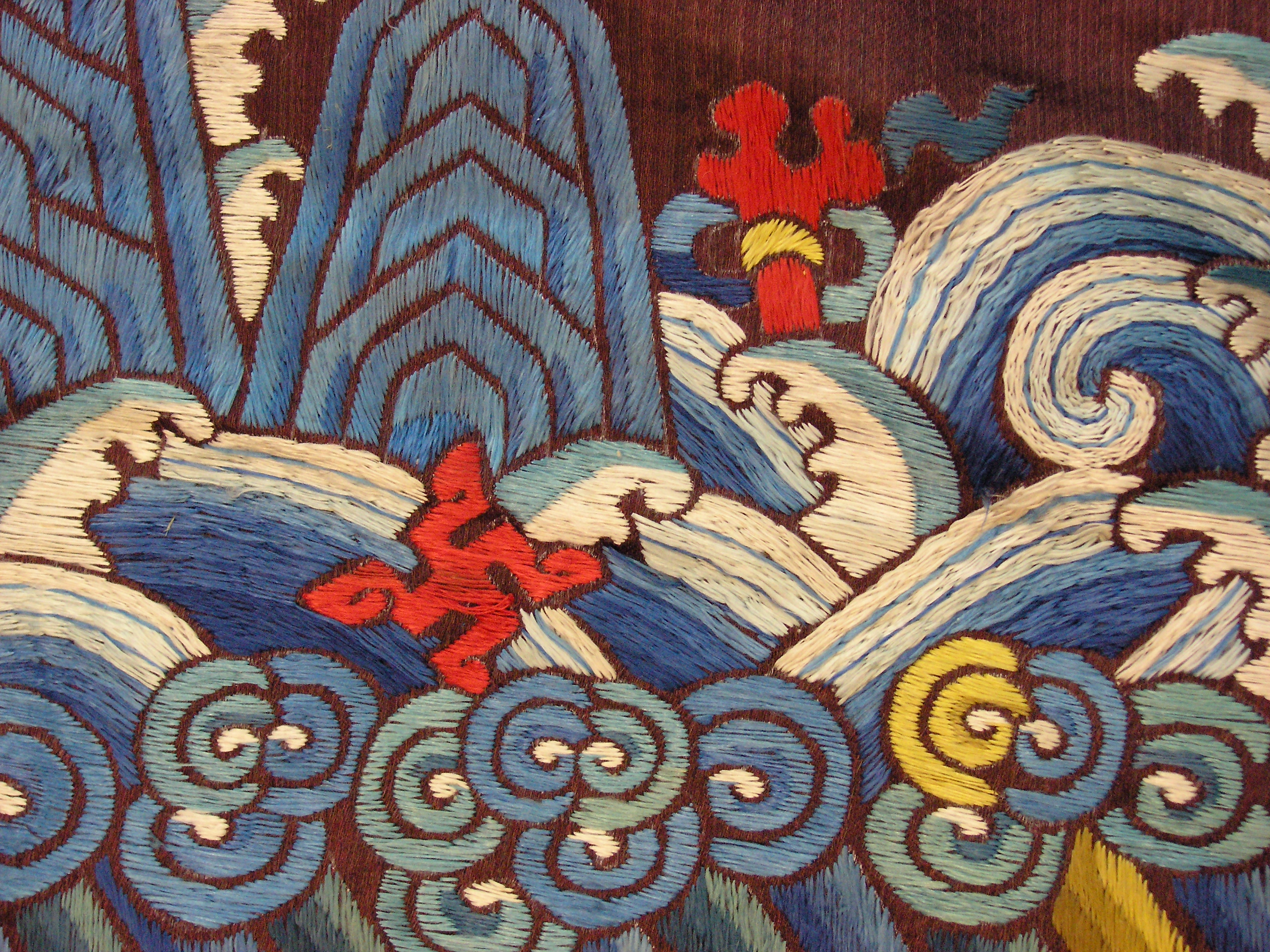
Embroidery of wan on a dragon robe, Qing dynasty

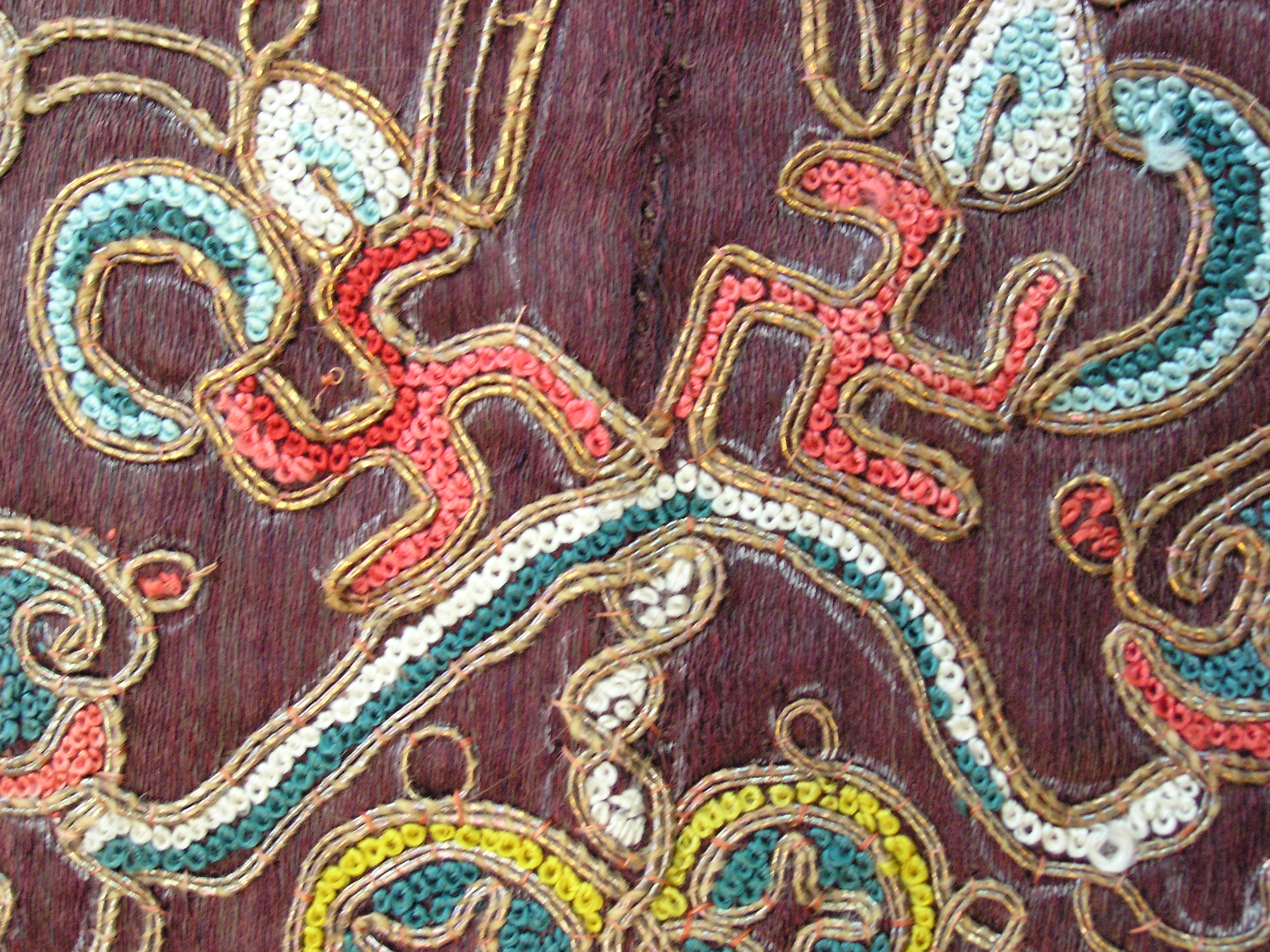
Double wan embroidery on a robe, Qing dynasty

The Chinese character wan, written as《卐》or《卍》, is similar to the swastika. It is a symbol of immortality. It was adopted from a Buddhist symbol. It was declared as the source of all good fortune in 693 by Wu Zetian who called it wan.

Wan sounds the same as "ten thousand" or "infinity"; as such adding wan to another symbol pattern multiplies that wish 10,000 times. It can be combined with other Chinese characters such as shou (longevity).

=== Xi ===
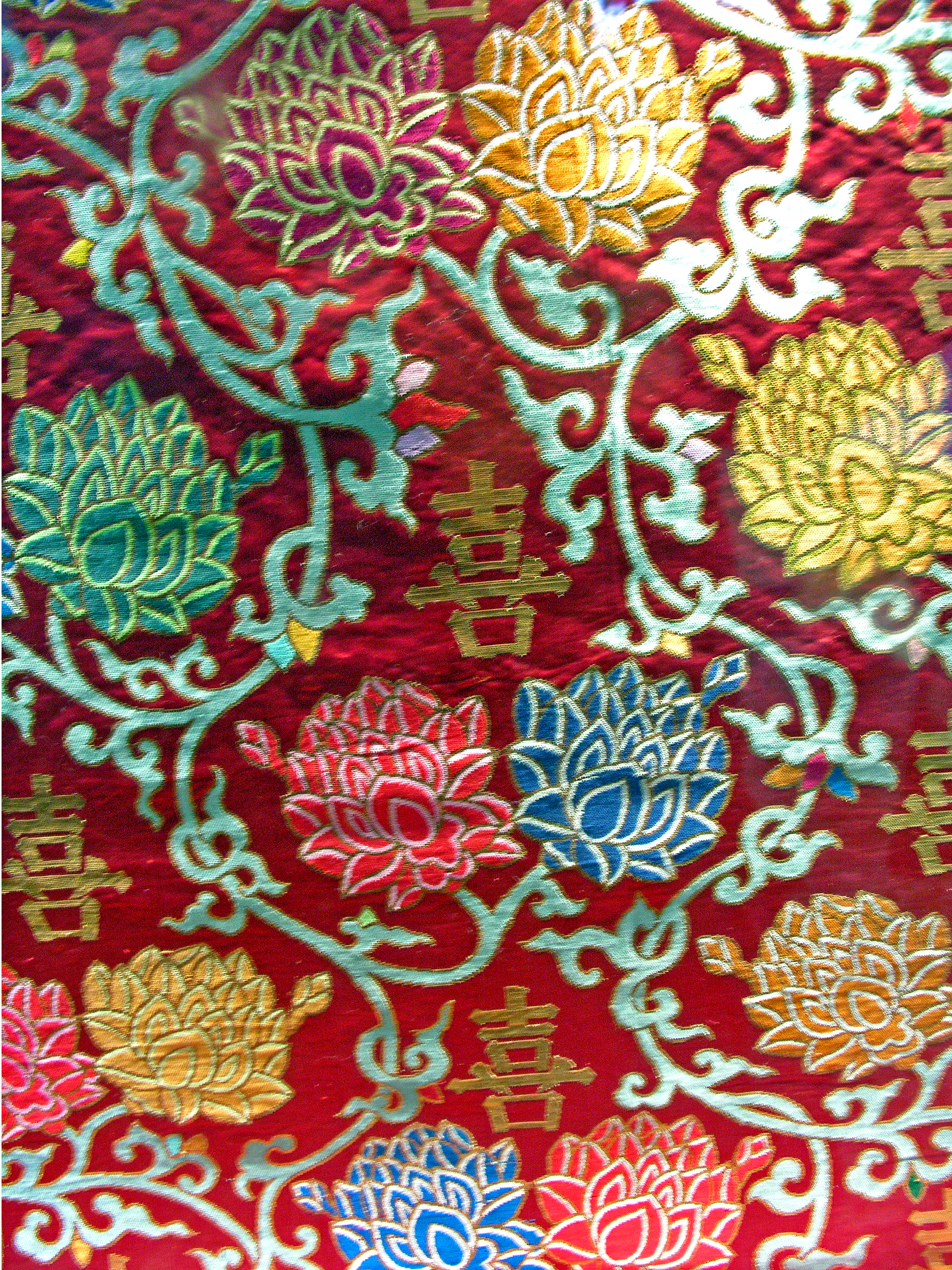
Character xi on textile

The character xi (喜) means happiness.

=== Xi/ double happiness ===
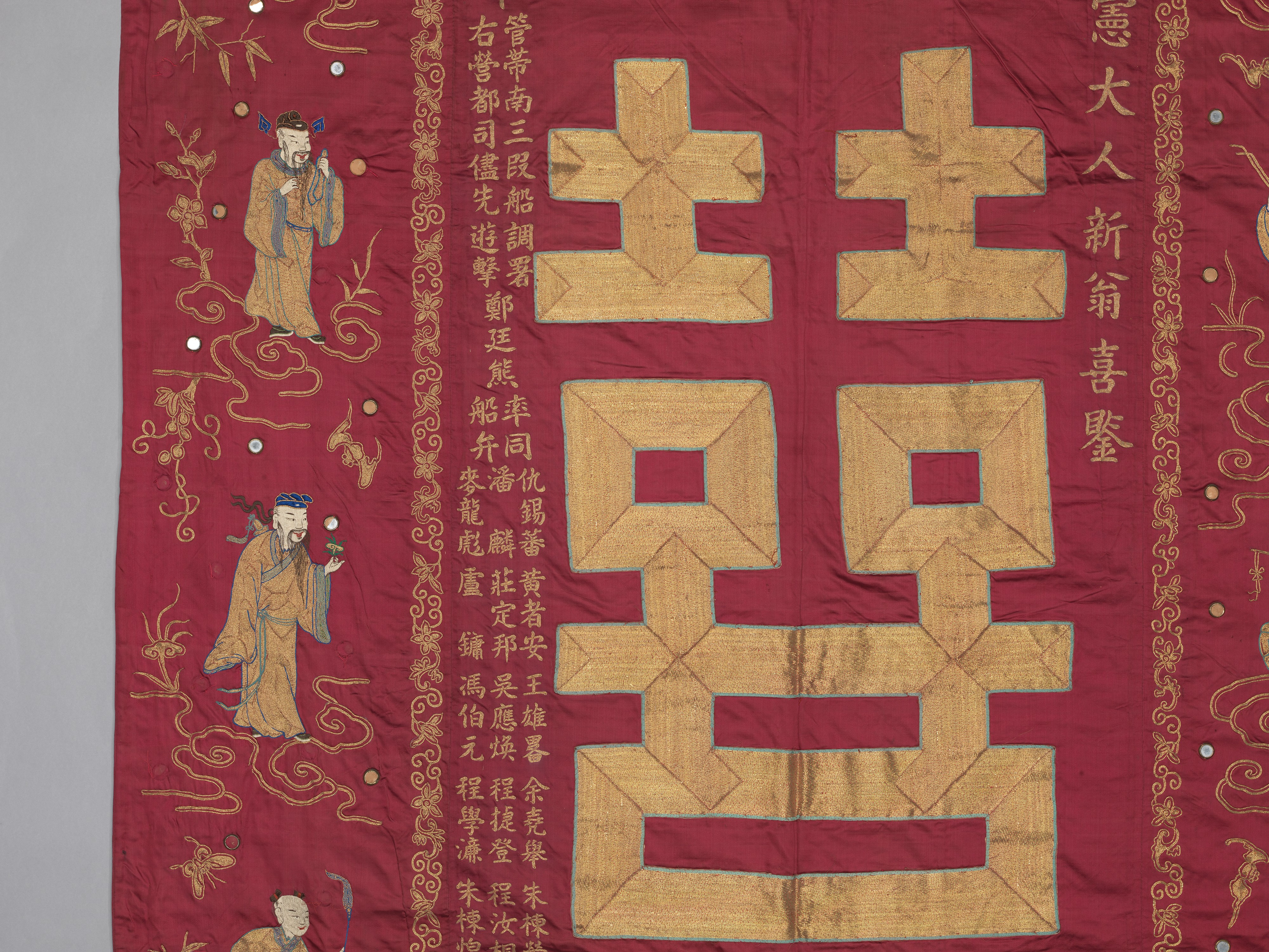
Double happiness (xi) on textile

The character xi (囍) or double happiness is a pattern which expresses blessing marriage and harmony.

== List of objects used in textile and clothing ==
=== Coins ===
Coins are symbol of wealth.

=== Precious gems/ stones ===
==== Coral ====
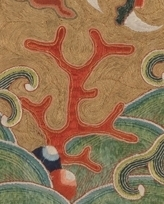
A twig of coral

A twig of coral symbolizes long age and career

==== Pearl or flaming pearl ====
Pearls (baozhu) is symbol of good fortune (wealth); it was used to decorate clothing. According to Chinese belief, pearls embodied the yin essence of the moon and would protect them from the yang essence of the sun. Pearls are often depicted with the imperial dragon as according to the legend, the dragon guards a peal under the water. The pearl is one of the Eight treasures and regularly appears on textiles and rank badge. By the mid-Qing dynasty, the pearl evolved into the flaming pearl. The flaming pearl represents the sun, wisdom, power and an imperial treasure.

=== Ball or flaming ball ===
The ball or flaming ball represents either the sun or the moon; it is sometimes referred as the "day or night shining pearl".

=== Animal-based objects ===
==== Rhinoceros horn ====
Rhinoceros horn is a symbol of virtue.

=== Literacy objects ===
Scrolls are symbol of learning.

== Related concepts ==
- List of Chinese symbols, designs, and art motifs
- Five colours
- Five blessings
- Chinese numerology

== See also ==
- Traditional patterns of Korea
- Chinese ornamental gold silk
- Chinese embroidery
