= Tsuba in the collection of Wolverhampton Art Gallery =

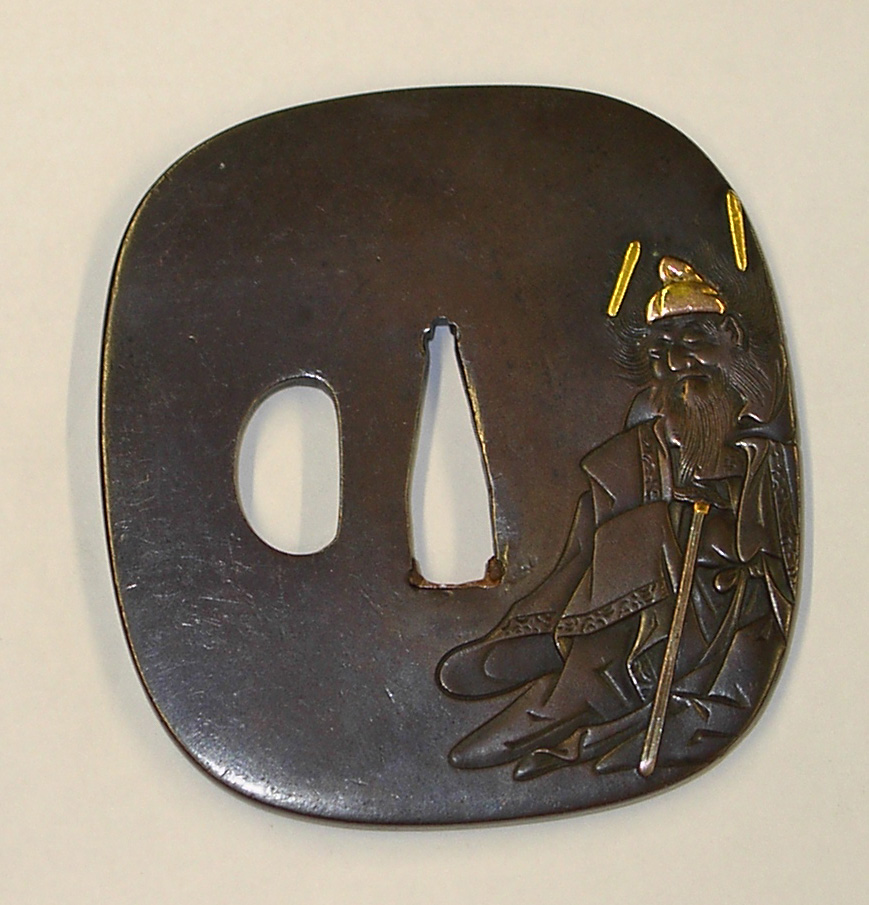
Copper tsuba upper side depicting the deity Shōki, by Hamano Shōzui (1695-1769)

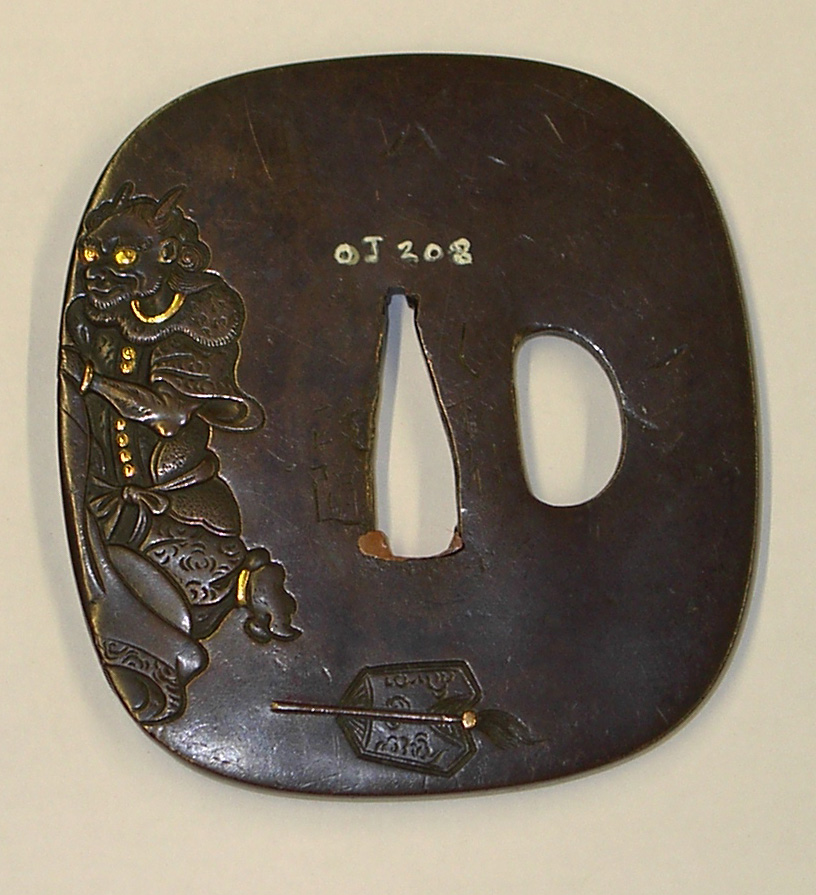
Lower side of the same tsuba depicting the demon

The Wolverhampton Art Gallery in Wolverhampton, England, has a collection of 114 historic tsuba from Japan. The tsuba (鍔; or 鐔) is usually a round (or occasionally squarish) guard at the end of the grip of bladed Japanese weapons, like the katana and its various variations. Items in the collection range from the Momoyama period (16th century) to the end of the Edo period (19th century).

== History ==
The tsuba were part of a wider collection of weapons and sword guards donated by Councilor Davis Green in October 1924. Originally the collection belonged to a Mr. C.E.F. Griffiths and was loaned to the gallery. The collection was reclaimed by the family, it is presumed that Mr. Griffiths died, and put it up for auction at Dudley Auction Rooms. Councilor Green bought the whole collection for £350 and donated it to the gallery.

== Collection ==
Tsuba mei (signature) of the maker Shōzui (1695-1769)

Illustrated here is an example of a copper, nadekaku gata, kaku mimi tsuba in the Hamano Nara style. The nakago has copper sekigane. The design in katakiribori with gold inlay depicts the myth of Shōki and the demon with Shōki on the upper side of the tsuba and a demon on the reverse. The mei (signature) reads: Otsuryūken Masayuki. The historian Henri L. Joly confirms that Masayuki is the same person as Shōzui (政随), an important founder member of the Hamano (浜野) branch of the Nara school. Mr. Hara Shinkichi and Naunton have identified that Shōzui also used the names Miboku and Otsuryūken. The dates for Masayuki are 1695–1796.

During the Edo period (1603–1868) the Tokugawa shogunate had a very strict dress code for attending the court. Samurai were required to wear kamishimo, or court dress. They wore the hakama, kimono and a special outer kimono with 'wings'. Sometimes they wore a shorter version of the wakizashi, or short sword, called a kamishimozashi. The koshirae for the sword was also very precise. All the fittings were made of shakudō with a nanako ground. The designs were also formal and consisted of flowers, family crests (mon), the crest of a daimyō, kiri blossom (paulownia flowers), or a dragon in clouds.

The shakudō mokko gata tsuba with gold fukurin mimi shown below in the image gallery is typical of the kind of tsuba designed for use at court. Its small size means it was made to fit a wakizashi. It has a takabori design of a bird with foliage and flowers on a nanako ground. It is from the Kikugawa school popular during the latter part of the Tokugawa shogunate. The omote mei reads Kikugawa Nanpo (菊川南甫), who is known to have been practicing during the later half of the nineteenth century. He was a pupil of Muneyoshi, who acquired the nickname Kikubori Chōbei because of his skill carving chrysanthemums. Later he studied the work of Chizuka Hisanari.

== Gallery ==
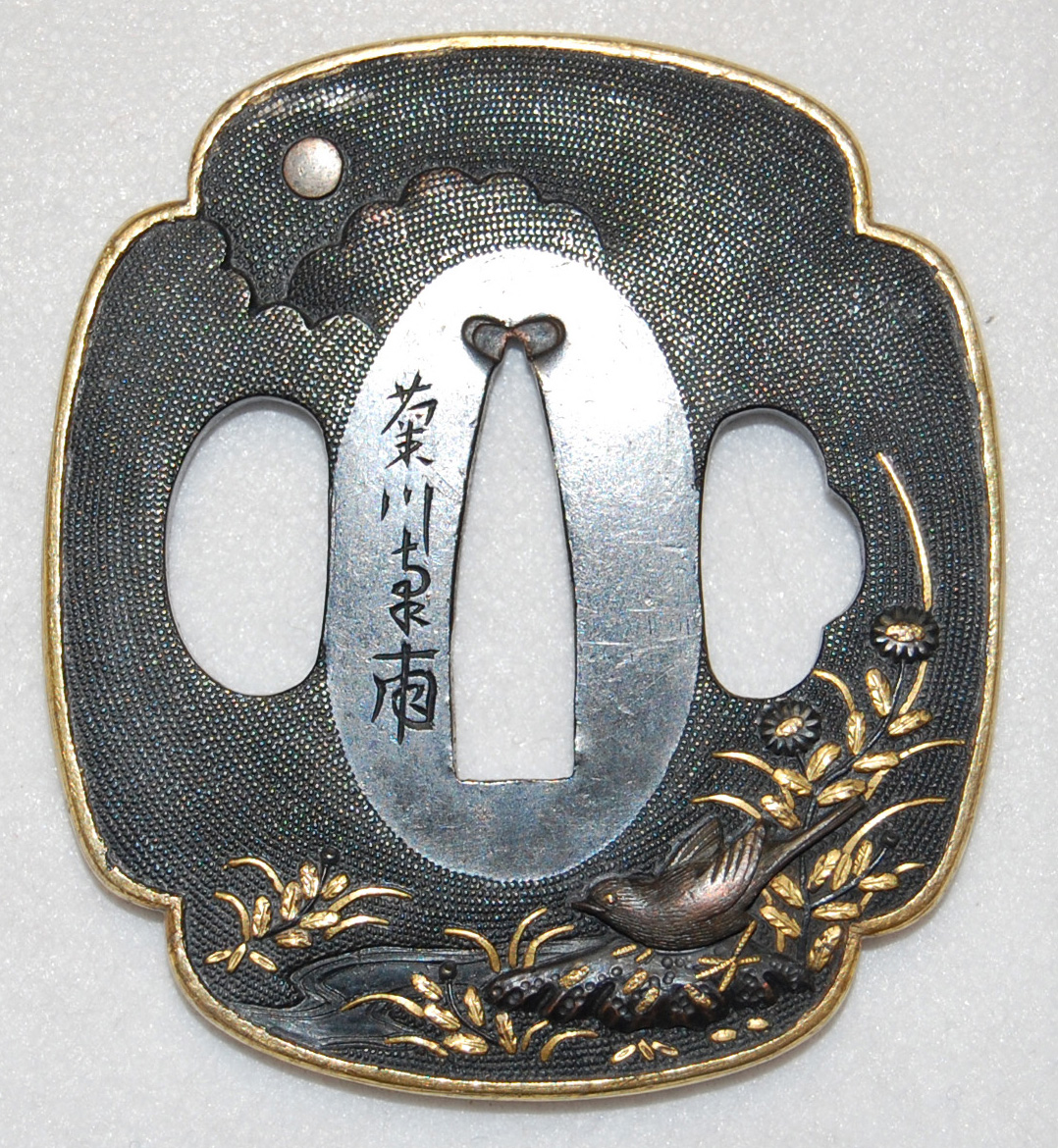
A mokko shakudo tsuba front side, decorated with a pheasant and plants, by Kikugawa Nanpo (late Edo period)

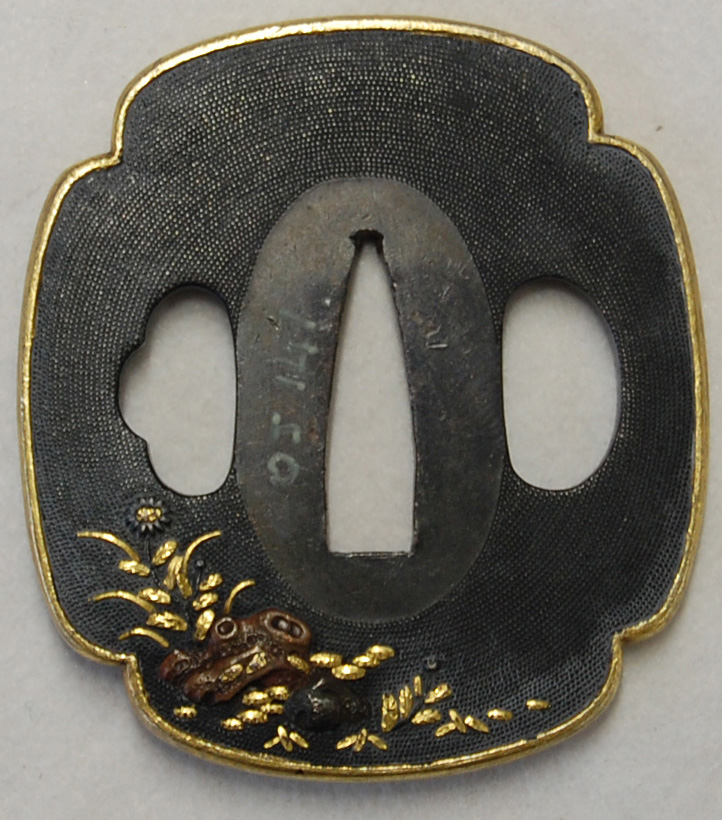
Back side (ura) of the same tsuba
