= Wufu =

Five traditional Chinese blessings

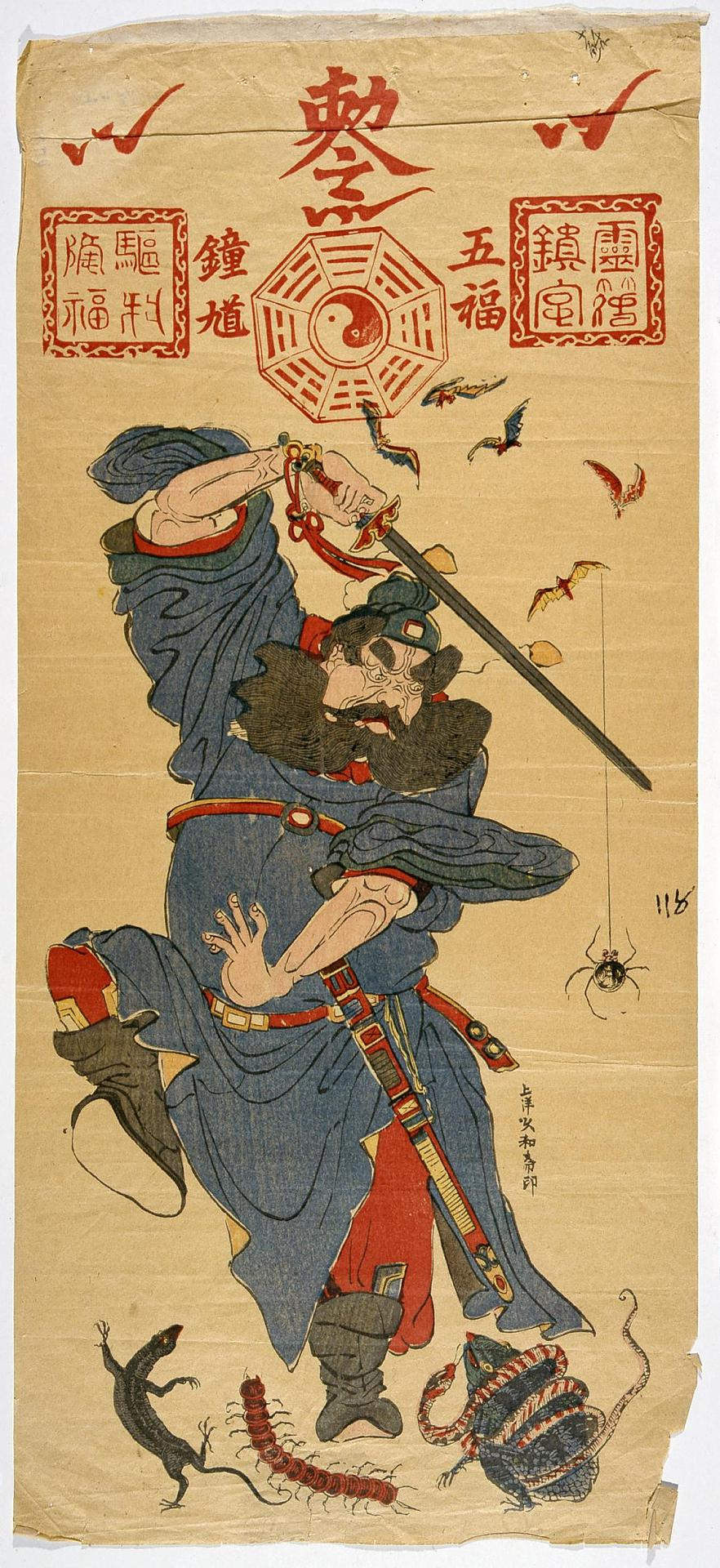
Zhong Kui with the wufu as represented by five bats, in a late 19th or early 20th century xylograph

Wufu (Chinese: 五福), meaning the five blessings, is a concept that signify a grouping of certain good fortunes and luck in Chinese culture.

The number five is regarded as an auspicious number in Chinese traditions and closely associated with the Five Elements (Wu Xing, Chinese: 五行), which are essential for a good life as well as the basic organisational principle in Chinese thought. As a result, the number five appears ubiquitously as in the Five Blessings.

== Meaning ==
The term wufu is originally cited in the Book of Documents in China Zhou dynasty (c. 1046 BC–256 BC). In Han dynasty (206 BC–220 AD), the Chinese philosopher, Huan Tan (桓譚) (c. 43 BC–28 AD) redefined the element of wufu. Generally speaking, the symbolic meaning of wufu invoking the blessing on positive hope such as good wealth and health.

=== Definition from Book of Documents ===
《書·洪范》："五福：一曰壽，二曰富，三曰康寧，四曰攸好德，五曰考终命。

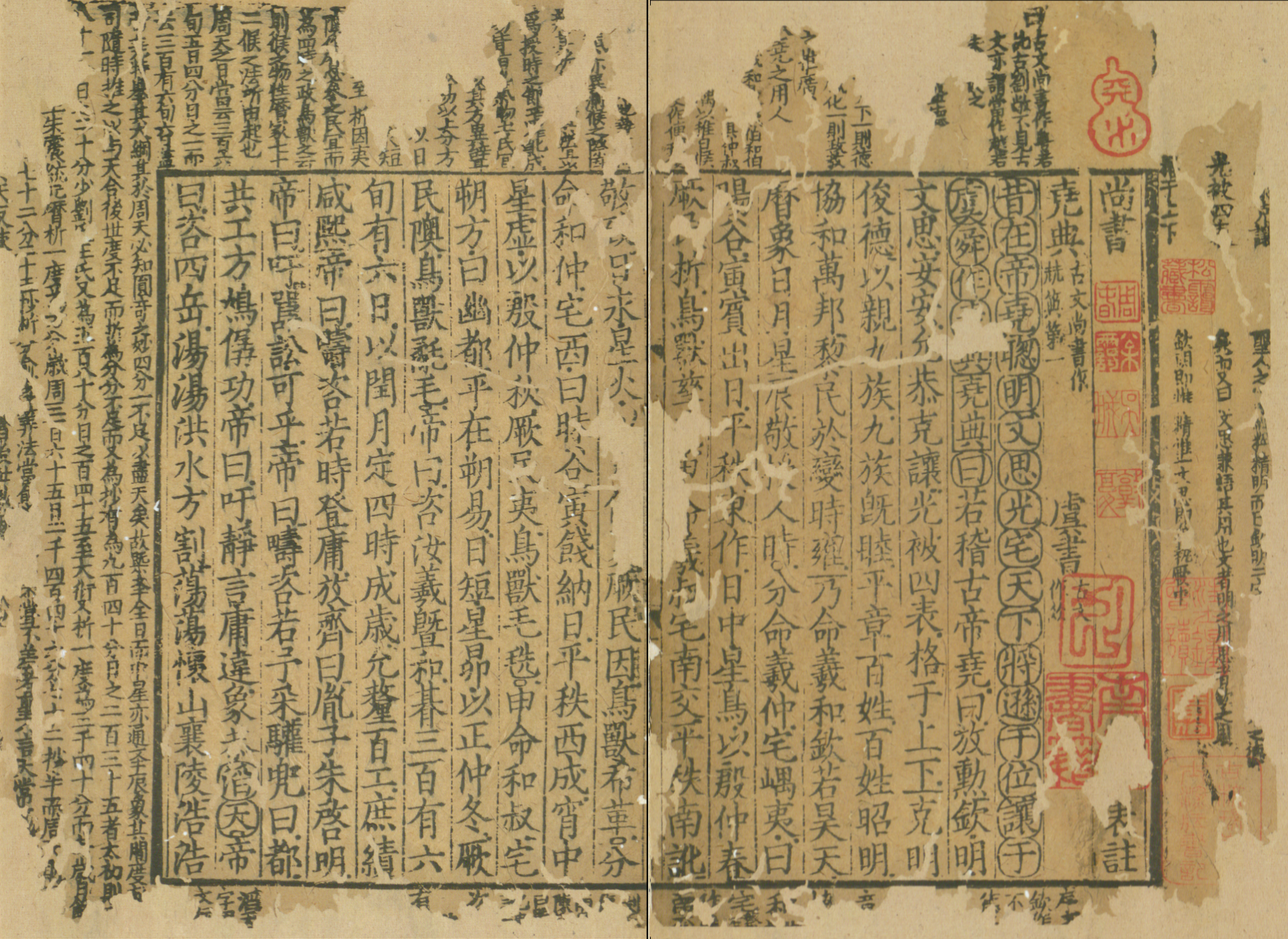
1279 printed edition of the Book of Documents

Referring the episode of Hong Fan in the Book of Documents, the meaning of five blessings are "health" (康寧)), "wealth" (富)), "long life" (壽)), "love of virtue" (yu hao te (攸好德)) and "peaceful death" (考終命)) accordingly.

Five blessings, are the concepts that first appeared in the episode of Hong Fan (洪範), Classic of History (also named as Shujing (書經) or Shangshu (尚書)), in ancient China, more than 2,000 years ago. They refer to "longevity" (壽; shou), "wealth" (富; fu), "health and composure" (康寧; kangning), "love of virtue" (修好德; xin hao de), and the "peaceful death in old age" (考終命; kao zhong ming), being the concrete forms of good luck. The last blessing, peaceful death, means dying naturally of old age without pain or suffering. It is interpreted finishing the allotted span of one's life with psychosocial comfort, acceptance and peace of mind individually.

=== Definition from Xinlun ===
桓譚《新論》："五福：壽、富、貴、安樂、子孫眾多。

According to the Xinlun (新論), as known as New Discussion, by Huan Tan, a different definition is given to the five blessings. Xinlun suggested that the meaning of five blessings are "longevity" (壽; shou), "wealth" (富; fu), "prosperity in government" (貴; kuei), "health" (安樂; an le) and "fertility" (子孫眾多; tzu-sun chung-tuo) accordingly. The meaning of "fertility and fecundity" in the definition of Xinlun still implies the original meaning of "long span of life" and "peaceful death" (kan zhong ming and shou) in the Book of Documents. However, the meaning of "kuei" refers to the "allotment and mandate of one’s share in government position and society," not the meaning of "love of virtue" mentioned in Book of Documents.

== Application in Chinese traditions ==
=== Rebus of Wu Fu Peng Shou ===
Shou and five red bats

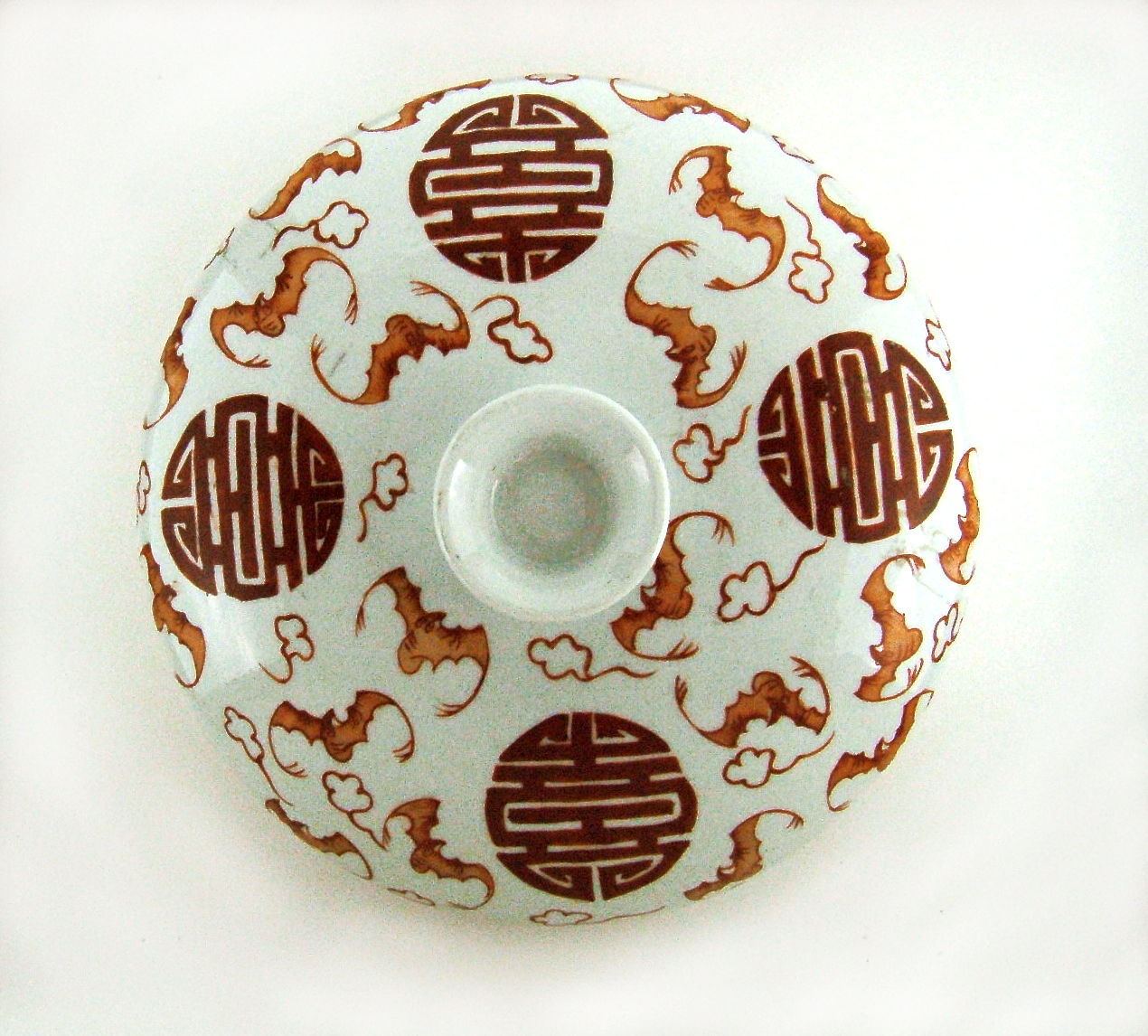
Shou and red bats on porcelain

The rebus of Wǔ Fù Pĕng Shòu (五褔捧壽) is used by Chinese people in their lives. Referring to the rebus, there are five bats surrounding the Chinese character for longevity, which literally imply blessings of longevity. Thus, the rebus is regarded as a powerful and auspicious motif in Chinese society. The Chinese people like adopting this rebus in architecture, since they believe that the good fortunes will come to their families afterward.

=== Rebus of Wu Fu He He ===
Wǔ Fù Hé Hé (五褔和合[盒]) is another rebus used by Chinese people. It is an image which contains five bats flying above a round box. Though hé hé (和合) literally means "box" (盒), its implied meaning is "harmony", since the Chinese word Hé (盒) is phonetically the same as hé (合). Hehé (和盒) is actually the name of a fairy of a Chinese myth, who symbolized the mutual love between the married couple. Chinese people hope the rebus of "Wu Fu He He" will bring blissful and harmony life to the married couple.

=== Phrase of Wu Fu Lin Men ===
The phrase Wu Fu Lin Men (五褔臨門) is commonly used among Chinese as a blessing to their relatives especially during the Chinese New Year. The rebus of "Wu Fu Lin Men" is created by five grouped bats. Many Chinese people would post up the "Wu Fu Lin Men" red paper on their home, to wish the Five good fortune will come to their home in the coming year. They hope every family member can get the "Fu", so that everyone will be lucky afterward. They hope the "Lu" will enable their family members to embrace honor or status in their job, so that they can gain prosperity. They hope the "Shou" will let the elderly to have a long life. They hope the "Xi" will enable the young couple to get married or enable the married couples to have babies. They hope the Cai (財; "wealth") will enable them to a make good fortune through business, trade or harvest.

== See also ==
- Shou (character)
- Fu (character)
- Double Happiness (calligraphy)
