= Zhong Kui the Demon Queller with Five Bats =

Chinese painting

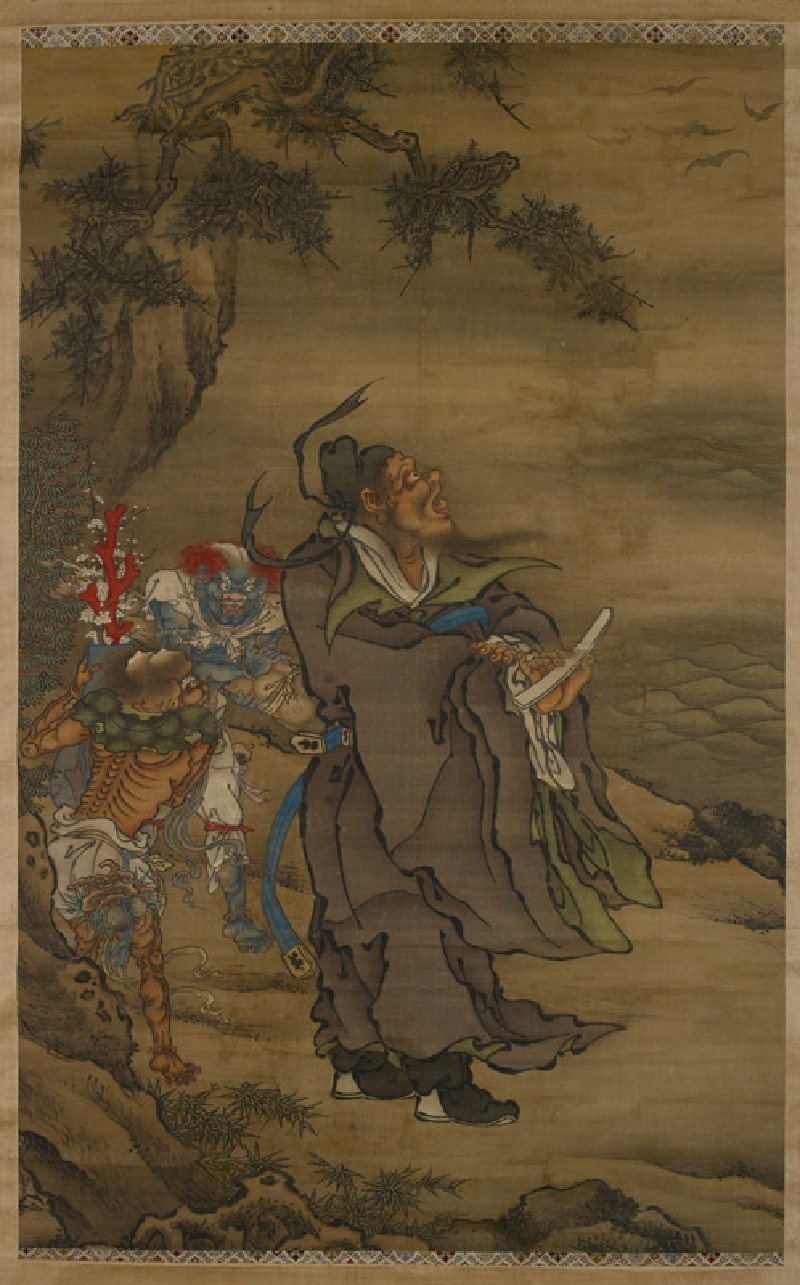
The painting Zhong Kui the Demon Queller with Five Bats from the Ming dynasty

Zhong Kui the Demon Queller with Five Bats is a Chinese painting featuring the Chinese mythological spirit Zhong Kui, dating to the Ming dynasty (1368–1644). A possible painter is Wu Wei, though it is probably by a skilled but unknown artist in a similar style. The painting uses a vigorous "popular" style; it is now in the Ashmolean Museum in Oxford, England. It measures 160 x 111.5 cm.

== Description ==
The picture shows Zhong Kui, accompanied by two of his demon followers. The demons are holding a vase and Zhong Kui holds a sceptre while looking up at five bats flying in the sky. In Chinese symbolism, the five bats represent five blessings: health, longevity, virtue, wealth, and a graceful death. The plum blossoms, pine, and bamboo represent perseverance.

In the background is a forested mountain surrounded by a heavy mist. The painting shows a winter landscape; Zhong Kui was associated with repelling bad spirits and attracting blessings at the time of the Chinese New Year.
