= Guanqiao, Liuyang =

Guanqiao Town 官桥镇
- Town
- Location in Hunan
- Coordinates: 27°55′52″N 113°21′16″E
- Country: People's Republic of China
- Province: Hunan
- Prefecture-level city: Changsha
- County-level city: Liuyang

Area
  - Total: 87.9 km^{2} (33.9 sq mi)

Population (2015)
  - Total: 26,600
  - Density: 303/km^{2} (784/sq mi)
- Time zone: UTC+8 (China Standard)
- Postal code: 410181
- Area code: 0731

Guanqiao Town (simplified Chinese: 官桥镇; traditional Chinese: 官橋鎮; pinyin: Guānqiáo Zhèn) is a rural town in Liuyang City, Hunan Province, People's Republic of China. As of the 2015 census it had a population of 26,600 and an area of 87.9 square kilometres (33.9 sq mi). The town is bordered to the north and northwest by Zhentou Town, to the east by Puji Town, and to the south by Lusong District of Zhuzhou.

== Administrative divisions ==
The town is divided into four villages and one community, which include the following areas:

- Jizhen Community (集镇社区)
- Sugu Village (苏故村)
- Yijiang Village (一江村)
- Bajiaoting Village (八角亭村)
- Shihuizui Village (石灰嘴村)

== Economy ==
The main industries in and around the town are forestry and farming.

== Geography ==
Liuyang River, also known as the mother river, flows through the town.

Xiashan Reservoir (峡山水库) is the largest body of water and the largest reservoir in the town.

Mount Daniuling (打牛岭) is a mountain in the town. The peak is 270 metres (890 ft) in elevation.

== Education ==
- Guanqiao Middle School

== Transportation ==
=== Railway ===
The Shanghai–Kunming railway passes across the town north to south.

The Hangzhou–Changsha high-speed railway, which connects Hangzhou and Changsha, running through the town north to south.

=== Expressway ===
The Shanghai–Kunming Expressway which heads south to Kunming, passing through the town.

The Liuyang–Liling Expressway is a north–south expressway in the town.

== Religion ==
Zhong Kui Temple (钟馗庙) is a Taoist temple in the town for worship of Zhong Kui.
