= Children Playing in an Autumn Garden =

Song dynasty painting

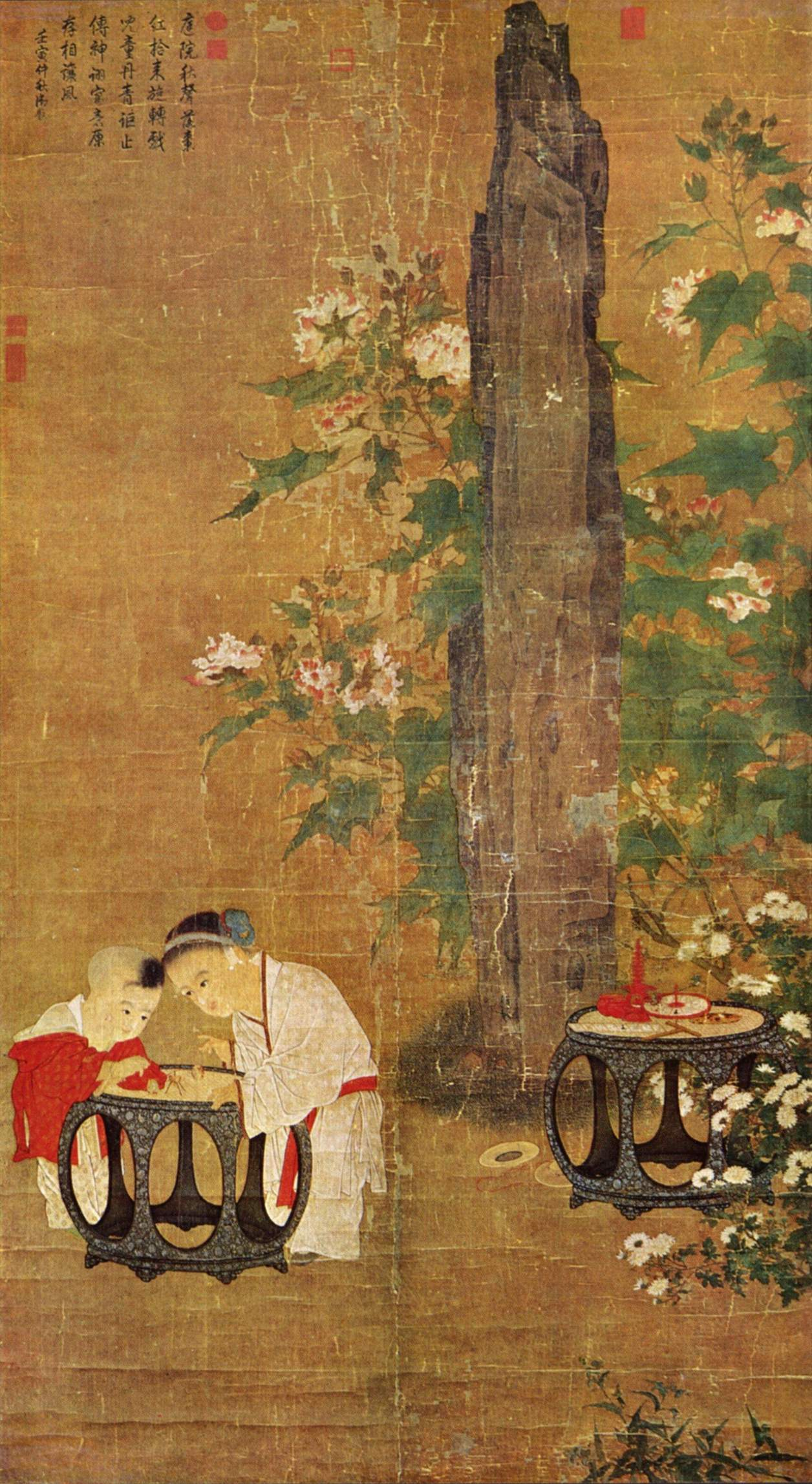
- Artist: Su Hanchen (attributed)
- Year: c. 1150
- Medium: Ink on silk
- Movement: Song dynasty painting
- Dimensions: 197.5 cm × 108.7 cm (77.7 in × 42.7 in)
- Location: National Palace Museum, Taipei

Children Playing in an Autumn Garden (Chinese: 秋庭戲嬰圖; pinyin: Qiūtíng xì yīng tú) is a Song dynasty painting made around 1150, often attributed to Su Hanchen. It depicts two children playing a game on a lacquerware stool, spinning dried jujube fruits. Behind them are other toys, blooming flowers, and a large garden rock. Bearing seals and a colophon from the 18th century Qianlong Emperor, it is now held by the National Palace Museum in Taipei, Taiwan. It is one of the earliest surviving Chinese paintings of children without adults present.

== Description ==
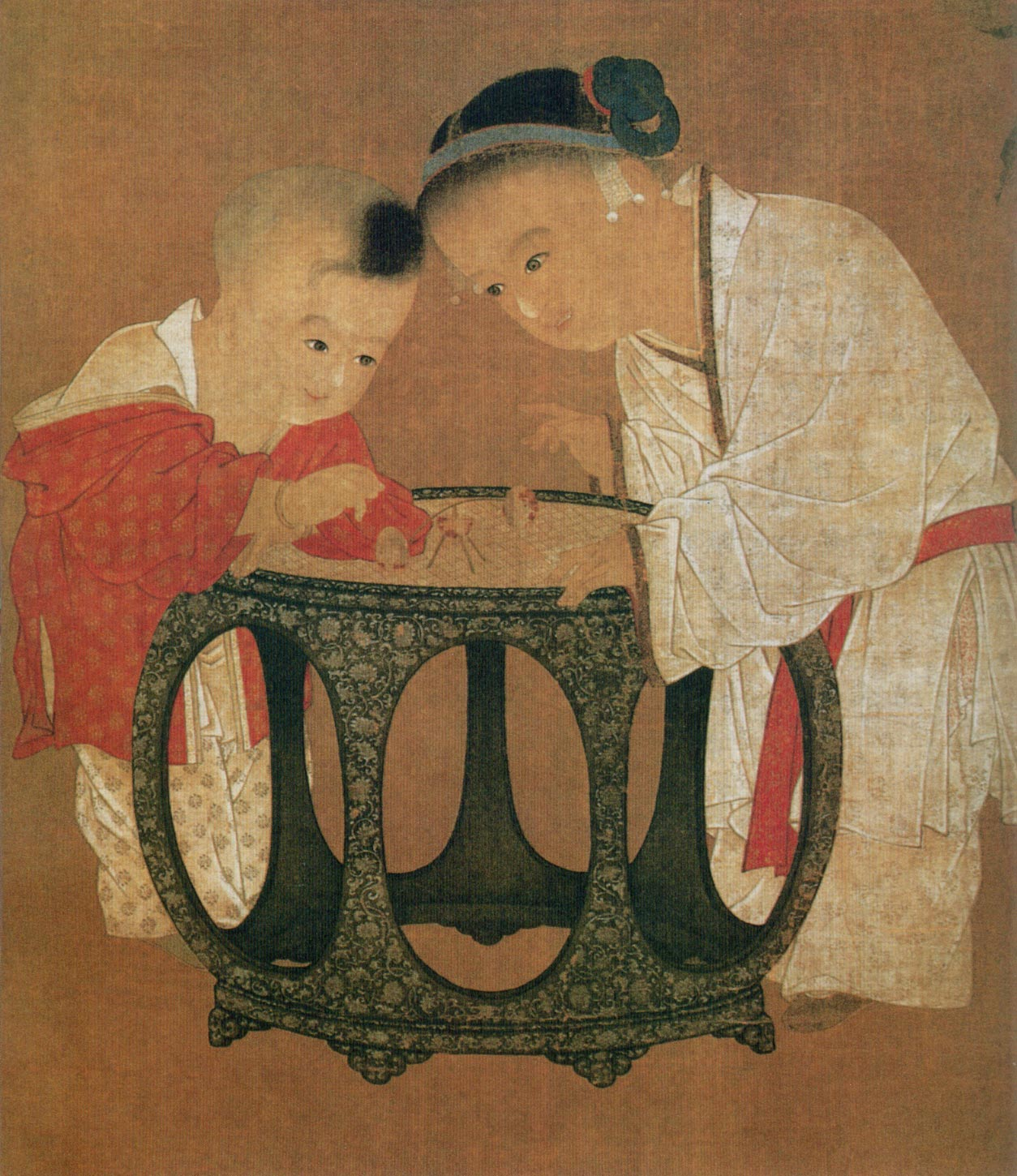
Section of the painting, showing the two children

Children Playing in an Autumn Garden (秋庭戲嬰圖; Qiūtíng xì yīng tú) is a silk painting on a large hanging scroll measuring 197.5 cm × 108.7 cm (6.48 ft × 3.57 ft). Very large for a hanging scroll, it is made of two silk panels which were bound together along its center. It shows two children—a girl and a younger boy—playing within a palace garden. Both children are depicted with expensive clothing and ornaments, suggesting a wealthy upbringing. The girl is depicted with her hair tied in knots with ribbons, jade hairpins, and pearl ornaments. She wears a white gown and white pants, both with floral decorations. The young boy, shaved bald except for a large tuft of hair on the front, wears white pants and a red shirt with a gold pattern.

The children are playing a game spinning dried jujube fruits atop a round stool. Besides them on another stool are various other toys, including a spinning top, two miniature horse archers attached to a spindle, and a tiny Buddha figurine inside a lacquerware pagoda. On the ground besides the stool are a pair of cymbals. Blooming chrysanthemums and hibiscus flowers, establishing the autumnal setting, are shown around a large pillar-like garden rock. An unidentified flower similar to dayflower is also depicted in the lower portion of the painting. The stools on which the children play appear to be made of black lacquerware with a bright floral inlay. As few surviving examples of lacquerware date to the Southern Song (between 1127 and 1279), the piece is useful for establishing its presence.

The painting bears a colophon written by the Qianlong Emperor, an 18th-century ruler of the Qing dynasty, alongside ten of his seals. It is now held by the National Palace Museum in Taipei, Taiwan. It was exhibited in the United States as part of the 1961–1962 exhibition Chinese Art Treasures.

=== Attribution ===
The painting lacks any artist's signature or seal. Art historians Richard and Catherine Barnhart described the piece as similar in its iconography to the late 11th century pieces made during the reign of Emperor Shenzong of Song, but that stylistically it could have been made as late as the first decade of the 13th. However, it is most often attributed to the 12th century painter Su Hanchen.

Children Playing in an Autumn Garden shares mainly similarities with another Song dynasty painting often attributed to Su, Winter Play (冬日嬰戲圖; Dōngrì yīng xì tú). They are of nearly identical proportions, and both are made from two bolts of silk bound together. Both depict an older sister and a young brother at play; the art historian James Cahill notes that the children are very similar between the two paintings, but likely represent a general archetype of children rather than any specific people. Microscopic analysis of the silk in the two paintings shows that they were likely made from the same material.

=== Significance ===
Paintings focusing on children first developed in China during the Six Dynasties (220–559), and gradually developed over the following centuries and dynasties. Unlike the scenes commonly depicted in prior Chinese art, no adults are shown in Children Playing in an Autumn Garden. Barnhart and Barnhart described the painting as emblematic of a shift in Chinese art, where people other than wealthy Chinese men were allowed to "take center stage in the world of art and are presented to us as fully individualized human beings".
