= Su Hanchen =

Chinese painter (1094–1172)

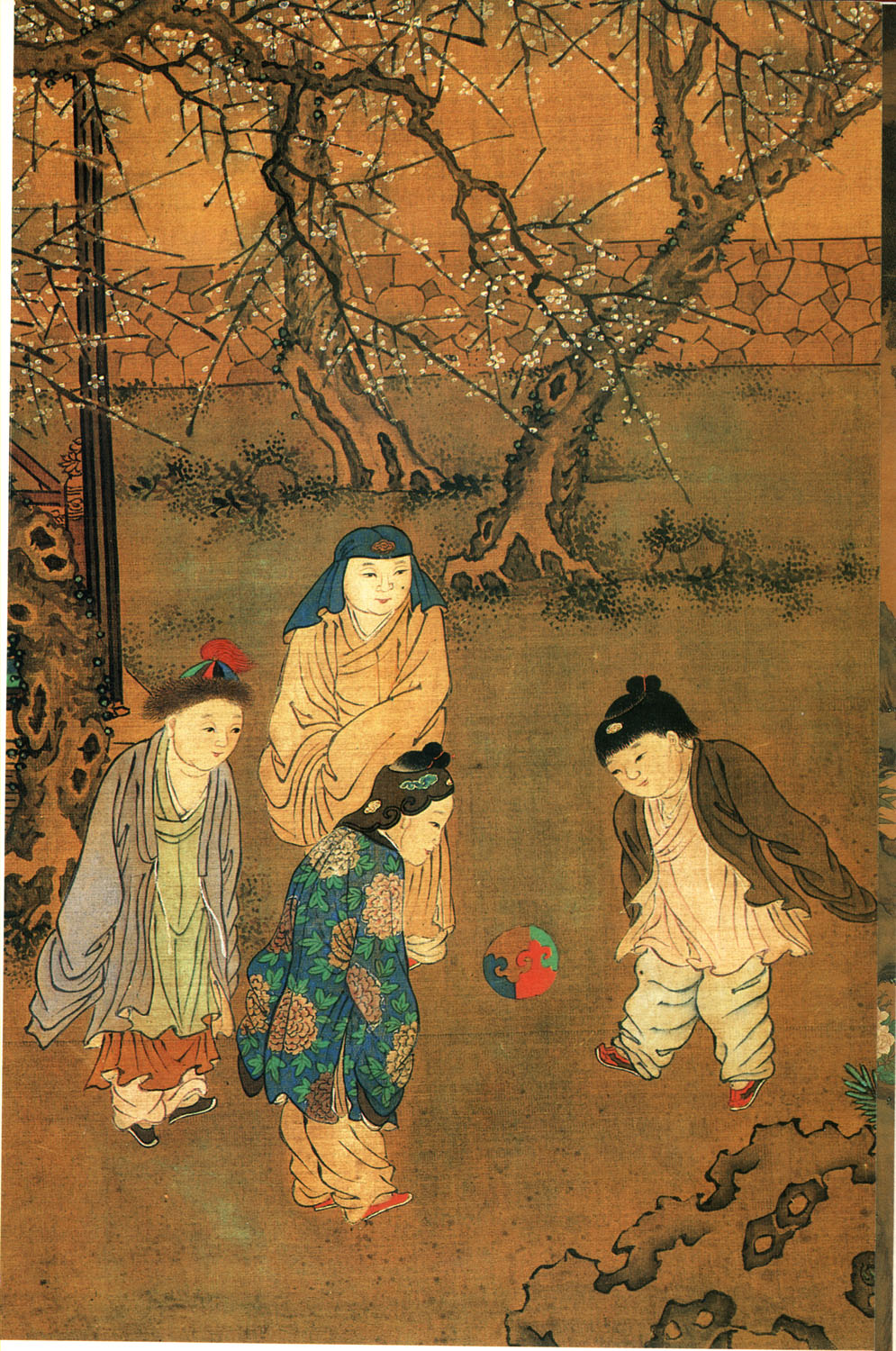
One Hundred Children in the Long Spring (長春百子圖).

Su Hanchen (Chinese: 蘇漢臣; pinyin: Sū Hànchén; 1094–1172) was a Chinese painter active in the Song dynasty. A native of Bianjing (present-day Kaifeng, Henan), he was renowned for his figure paintings and was appointed as a "Painter-in-Attendance" by Emperor Huizong. For most of his career, Su was based in Zhejiang.

== Career ==
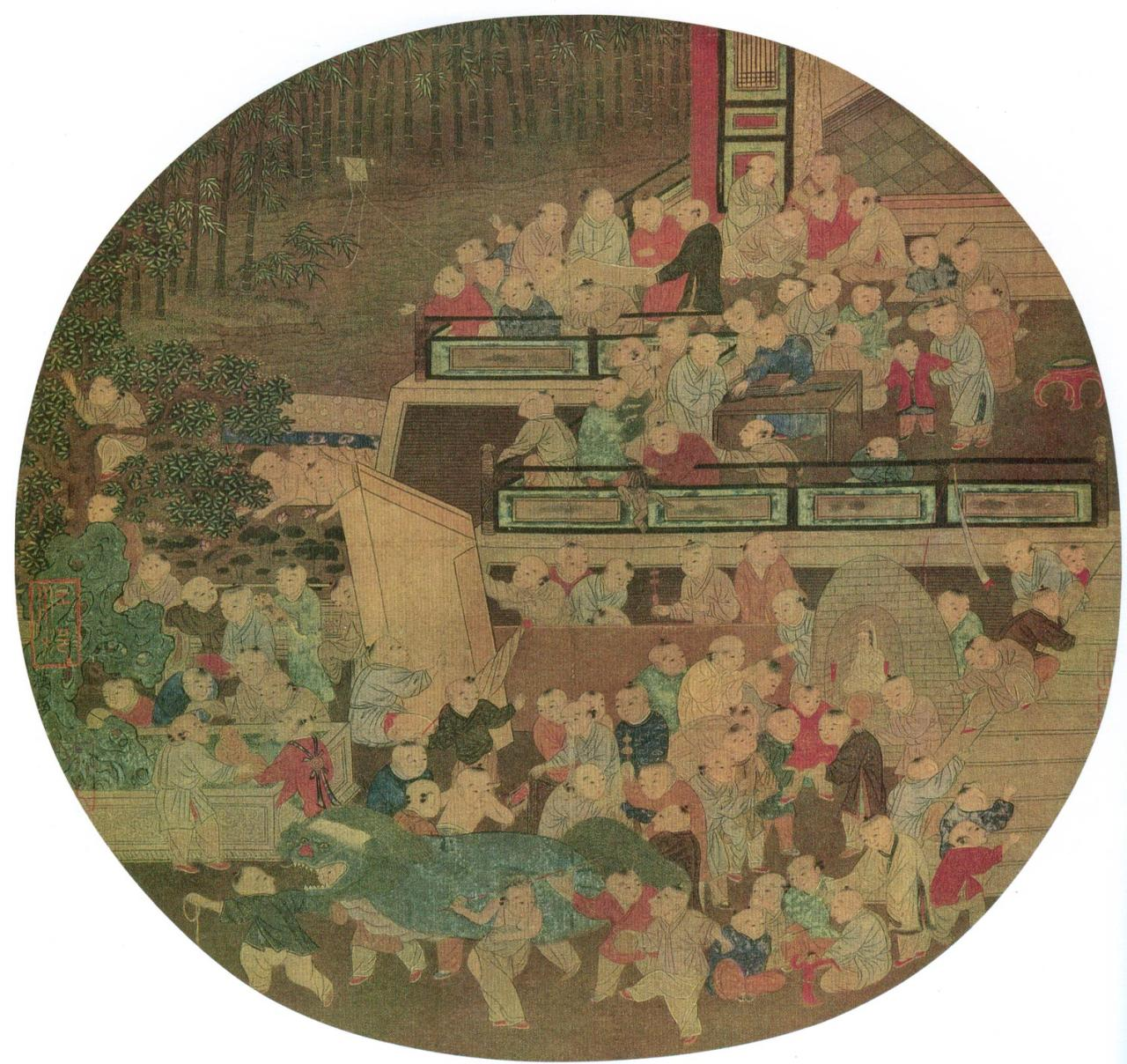
"One Hundred Children Playing in the Spring" by Su Hanchen

Su was born in 1094 in Bianjing (present-day Kaifeng, Henan). He was employed by the Northern Song court's Academy of Painting "solely for his skills at painting", and subsequently designated as a "Painter-in-Attendance" by Emperor Huizong. He was known for his figure paintings, especially those of women and children.

In Su's seminal baizi (百子) or "hundred-boys" paintings, "generic but appealing" children are usually depicted in gardens, and can be seen engaging in various leisurely activities, from dancing to kite-flying. Su also painted Buddhist and Taoist figures, although most of these paintings are now considered lost. Su spent most of his career in Zhejiang. He died in 1172.

== Legacy ==
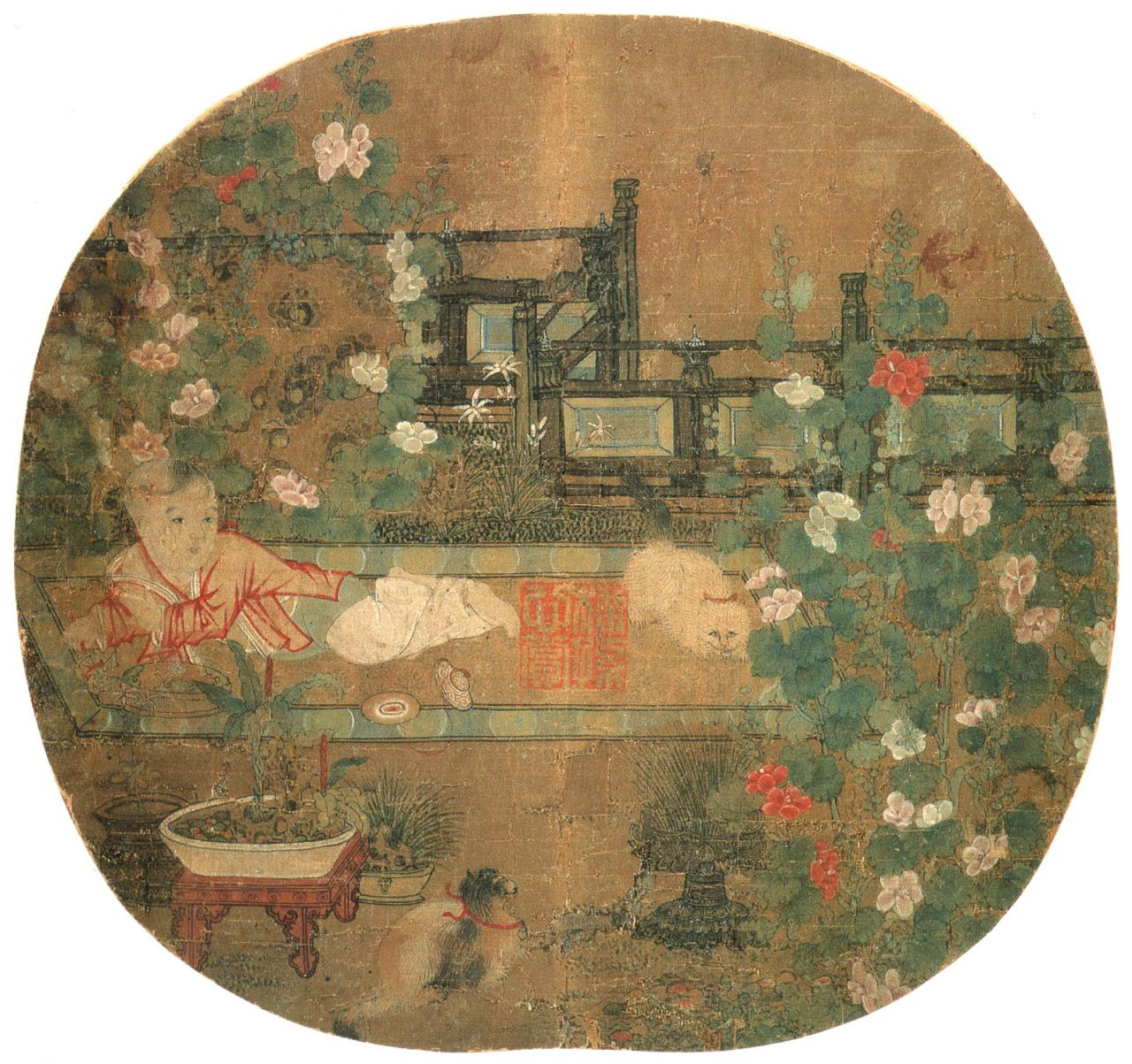
"Pair of Cats and Baby at Play" by Su Hanchen

According to Gu Bing (顾炳), who included Su's Woman Bathing Child in his 1603 Master Gu's Painting Manual (Gushi huapu; 顧氏畫譜), Su's application of colour was "fresh" and he depicted figures "as though alive". Art historian James Cahill remarked that Su's paintings "have an immediate appeal that has made them popular everywhere". Two of his most celebrated works, Children Playing in an Autumn Garden and Children at Play on a Winter Day, are on display at the National Palace Museum in Taipei. According to the Shanghai Daily, these two paintings are "usually regarded as the best example of Song paintings themed on children playing in a private garden".
