= List of Chinese symbols, designs, and art motifs =

A list of Chinese symbols, designs, and art motifs, including decorative ornaments, patterns, auspicious symbols, and iconography elements, used in Chinese visual arts, sorted in different theme categories. Chinese symbols and motifs are more than decorative designs as they also hold symbolic but hidden meanings which have been used and understood by the Chinese people for thousand of years; they often influenced by nature, which include the fauna, the flora, landscape, and clouds. Chinese symbols often have auspicious meanings associated to them, such as good fortune, happiness, and also represent what would be considered as human virtues, such as filial piety, loyalty, and wisdom, and can even convey the desires or wishes of the Chinese people to experience the good things in life. There are also special symbols in Chinese arts, such as the qilin, and the Chinese dragon. According to Chinese beliefs, being surrounding by objects which are decorated with such auspicious symbols and motifs was and continues to be believed to increase the likelihood that those wishes would be fulfilled even in present-day. Chinese symbols and motifs are often found in Chinese decorative arts, porcelain ware, clothing, and personal adornments.

== Categorized sets or collections ==
- Chinese zodiac
- Eight Auspicious pattern (Bajixiang 八吉祥): The Eight Auspicious symbols of Buddhism
- Eight treasures (Babao 八寶)/ Eight precious things
- Flowers of the Four Seasons
- Four gentlemen
- Five Poisons
- Four symbols
- Twelve ornaments

== Natural landscape and cosmology ==
=== Clouds, sun, stars, and moon ===
Type	Name		Images
Clouds	Xiangyun / auspicious clouds		
Cosmic symbol	Yunjian (云肩)/ cloud collar motif	Persimon calyx	

=== Waves and sea ===
Types	Name	Images
Composite	Haishuijiangya (海水江崖)	
Waves	Lang	

== Animals ==
=== Mammals ===
Name		Symbolism	Images
Bats	Bat (fu)	Homophone for good fortune and symbol for longevity and happiness.	
Bats	Bats flying amongst clouds		
Bats	Bats with Chinese character "wan"(Swastika)	"Ten thousand-fold wishes for good fortune and happiness."	
Bats	Five bats (wufu)	Wishes for the Five Blessings.	
Bats	Red bats (hongfu)	Wide spread of good fortune	
Deer	Lü		
Elephant	Xiang		
Horses	A horse	Speed and perseverance	
Horses	Eight horses	The 8 horses of King Mu of Zhou	
Tiger			

=== Birds ===
Birds were symbols of literary refinement of the scholars with ability to fly towards the Heaven.

Name		Images
Crane	A red-crowned crane	
Magpie		
Mandarin duck	A mandarin duck	
Mandarin duck	Pairs of mandarin duck	

=== Fish ===
Types		Name	Symbolism	Images
Fish	Single fish	Yu (鱼, lit. "fish")	Wealth and abundance	
Fish	Single fish	Carp jumping at the Dragon Gate	Success in the civil service examinations	
Fish	Double fish	Shuangyuwen (双鱼纹)/ Double fish/ twin fish: two horizontal fishes, each facing an opposite direction	Marital happiness; fertility and abundance	
Fish	Double fish	Pairs of golden fish/ Golden fish (as part of the Eight Auspicious pattern): two fishes in the vertical planes, with their faces inward. (Note: When part of the Eight Auspicious pattern, both two fishes can either be upright (going upward) or be upside down (going downward).)	Good fortune; happiness; freedom from restraint	

=== Insects ===
Name		Description	Symbolism	Images
Butterflies	Butterfly/ butterflies	A common motif used in Chinese embroidery and in Chinaware.	The butterfly is a symbol of joy and summer. It also implies long life, beauty and elegance.	
Butterflies	Pair of butterflies	Pair of butterflies embroidered on clothing strengthens the energy of love.	Love, especially young love; undying bond between lovers.	
Cicada		Cicada motifs were used as early as the Shang and Zhou dynasties to decorate bronze; both realistic and stylized cicada motif were used during these periods. Cicada motifs were also used in 17th and 18th when decorating bronze and cloisonne objects which imitating ancient bronzes. Jade carved in the shaped of a cicada used to be placed in the mouth the deceased before being buried. It was believed that cicada jade would prevent the decaying of a corpse or speed up the deceased's rebirth.	Symbol of immortality and resurrection (or regeneration); it is also a symbol of happiness and eternal youth as cicada's longevity is longer than other insects.	Cicada jade used in burial practice, Han dynasty

== Imaginary animals ==
=== Chimeral animals ===
Type		Name	Symbolism	Images
Chinese dragons (Note: Depending on the time period, the Chinese dragons were depicted with 3, 4, or 5 claws. Since the Ming and Qing dynasties, it was established that the Chinese dragons (Long 龙) required 5-claws to meet their established definition of a Long (龙). Chinese dragons with less than 5 claws were no more considered as 'real' long (龙) dragons; e.g. the 4-clawed dragon then became known as mang (蟒, lit. "python").)	C-shaped dragon/ Ring-like dragon	Hong (rainbow-dragon)		
Chinese dragons	C-shaped dragon/ Ring-like dragon	Hongshan Jade dragon		
Chinese dragons	C-shaped dragon/ Ring-like dragon	Panlong		
Chinese dragons	C-shaped dragon/ Ring-like dragon	Shuanglong		
Chinese dragons	C-shaped dragon/ Ring-like dragon	Zhulong (Pig dragon)		
Chinese dragons	Curly and coiled dragon	Azure dragon		
Chinese dragons	Curly and coiled dragon	Kuilong (夔龙)		
Chinese dragons	Curly and coiled dragon	Panchi		
Chinese dragons	Curly and coiled dragon	Zisunlong (子孙龙)		
Chinese dragons	Long dragon or mang dragon: 3-clawed dragons/ 4-clawed dragons, also called mang (蟒, lit. "python")/ 5-clawed dragons	Zhenglong (正龙)/ sitting dragon		
Chinese dragons	Long dragon or mang dragon: 3-clawed dragons/ 4-clawed dragons, also called mang (蟒, lit. "python")/ 5-clawed dragons	Lilong (立龙)/ standing dragon		
Chinese dragons	Long dragon or mang dragon: 3-clawed dragons/ 4-clawed dragons, also called mang (蟒, lit. "python")/ 5-clawed dragons	Shenglong (升龙) / ascending dragon		
Chinese dragons	Long dragon or mang dragon: 3-clawed dragons/ 4-clawed dragons, also called mang (蟒, lit. "python")/ 5-clawed dragons	Jianglong (降龙)/ descending dragon		
Chinese dragons	Long dragon or mang dragon: 3-clawed dragons/ 4-clawed dragons, also called mang (蟒, lit. "python")/ 5-clawed dragons	Xinglong (行龙)/ travelling dragon		
Chinese dragons	Long dragon or mang dragon: 3-clawed dragons/ 4-clawed dragons, also called mang (蟒, lit. "python")/ 5-clawed dragons	Dragon playing with pearl		
Chinese dragons	Long dragon or mang dragon: 3-clawed dragons/ 4-clawed dragons, also called mang (蟒, lit. "python")/ 5-clawed dragons	Two dragon playing with flaming pearl/ pearl		
Chinese dragons	Other 4-clawed dragons	Douniu		
Chinese dragons	Other 4-clawed dragons	Feiyu		
Phoenix-like	Feng/huang	Single male (feng) or female phoenix (huang)	Symbol of the empress of China.	
Phoenix-like	Fenghuang	Pair of phoenix (one male and one female)	Marital happiness	
Qilin		Male Qilin	Virtue and perfection	
Qilin		Female Qilin	Virtue and perfection	

=== Bird-like creatures ===
Types	Name		Symbolism	Image
Bird	Qingniao			
Crow-like creatures	Jinwu (lit."golden crow")/ Yangwu	Erzuwu (二足金, lit."two-legged crow")/ Erzujinnian (二足金乌, lit "two-legged golden crow"	Sun	
Crow-like creatures	Jinwu (lit."golden crow")/ Yangwu	Sanzuwu (三足烏, lit. "Three-legged crow ") (Note: The crow in the sun disk is referred as sanzuwu when it is depicted with having three-legged)	Sun	
Crow-like creatures	Sanzuwu (三足烏, lit. "Three-legged crow ")			
Pheasant-like creatures	Vermillion bird			

=== Animal-like creatures ===
Types	Name		Symbolism	Images
Fox-like creatures	Hulijing (狐狸精)/ Fox spirit	Nine-tail fox		
Goat (or sheep)-like creature	Taotie			
Goat (or sheep)-like creature	Xiezhi		Fairness, justice, and discrimination between the right and wrong.	
Horse-like creatures	Haima			
Lion-like creatures	Suan ni			
Rabbit-like creature	Yu tu (玉兔, lit. 'Jade rabbit') / Yue tu (月兔, lit. 'Moon rabbit')	Jade rabbit in the moon disk		
Rabbit-like creature	Yu tu (玉兔, lit. 'Jade rabbit') / Yue tu (月兔, lit. 'Moon rabbit')	Jade rabbit pounding medicine/ elixir of life		
Rabbit-like creature	Yu tu (玉兔, lit. 'Jade rabbit') / Yue tu (月兔, lit. 'Moon rabbit')	Rabbits running amongst clouds	Moon.	
Tiger-like creature	White tiger			
Toad-like (or frog-like) creature	Moon toad	toad on a moon crescent		
Toad-like (or frog-like) creature	Moon toad	Dancing frog		
Toad-like (or frog-like) creature	Three-legged toad	Jin Chan (Golden toad)		
Toad-like (or frog-like) creature	Three-legged toad	Jin Chan (Golden toad) biting a coin/ Money toad		
Tortoise-like creature	Black tortoise	Xuanwu (玄武; also one of the Four Symbols)		

=== Composite ===
Images		Name
Chinese dragon and fenghuang		
Dragon turtle	Dragon turtle with carrying a small turtle on its back	
Five poisons		
Moon rabbit and moon toad		

== Plants, flowers, and trees ==
=== Flowers ===
Name		Symbol	Images
Apricot	Apricot blossom		
Balsamine flower			
Chrysanthemum	Chrysanthemum flower	Symbol of autumn and longevity	
Hibiscus			
Lotus	Lotus flower		
Narcissus			
Osmanthus	Osmanthus blossom		
Peach	Peach blossom	Spring and happiness.	
Peony	Peony flower	Associated with royalty. It is also called "flower of rank and honour"; honours means attaining high rank, an official position or high social status.	
Plum	Plum flowers	Symbol of winter.	
Pomegranate	Pomegranate flower		
Winter sweet			

=== Trees and plants ===
Name	Images
Bamboo	
Willow tree	

=== Composite ===
Name	Description	Symbol	Images
Four gentlemen (si junzi)	Orchids, chrysanthemum, plum blossoms, and bamboo	Integrity and humility of the scholar.	
Three friends of winter	Plum blossoms, bamboo, and pine	Longevity and resistance to the elements.	

== Fruits, vegetables, kernels, mushroom, and seeds ==
=== Fruits ===
Name			Symbolism	Images
Gourd	Single gourd		Fertility	
Gourd	Double gourd		Representation of "Heaven and Earth" (associated with deities and immortals)	
Peaches	Peach fruit		Associated with the god Shoulao (god of longevity); symbol of a long life.	
Peaches	Peaches of immortality	Peach of immortality		
Peaches	Peaches of immortality	Peach and Chinese character shou		
Pomegranates	Pomegranate fruit	Whole pomegranate fruit		

=== Mushroom ===
Name	Symbol	Images
Lingzhi	Immortality and shares the meaning of ruyi (如意), "as you wish".	

== Inanimate objects ==
Name			Symbolism	Images
Coins	Chinese numismatic charm			
Gems/ Precious stone	Baozhu	Flaming pearl		
Gems/ Precious stone	Triratna/ triple gem			
Hand-held fan	Open hand-held fan			
Ingot	Gold ingot			
Ingot	Silver ingot			
Knots	Endless knots		Infinite wisdom of Buddha (Note: When part of the Eight Auspicious pattern.)	

== Chinese characters ==
Name			Symbolism	Images
財 (cái)	Stylized character		wealth	
佛 (fó)	Chinese character		Buddha	
福 (fú)	Chinese character	Upright	prosperity, good luck	
福 (fú)	Chinese character	Upside down	prosperity/good luck arrive (in almost all varieties of Chinese, upside down is a homophone for arrive)	
福 (fú)	Stylized character		prosperity, good luck	
禄 (lù)	Chinese character		blessing, prosperity	
禄 (lù)	Stylized character		blessing, prosperity	
壽 (shòu)	Chinese character		longevity	
壽 (shòu)	Stylized character		longevity	
壽 (shòu)	Shou with wan		longevity + ten thousand	
卐 or 卍 (wàn)	Chinese character		ten thousand	
囍 (xǐ)	Chinese character		“double happiness”, wedding bliss	
囍 (xǐ)	Stylized symbol		“double happiness”, wedding bliss	
福壽雙全 (fúshòushuāngquán)	Chinese characters		to enjoy both good fortune and longevity	

== Taoist religion ==
=== Taoist deities and immortals ===
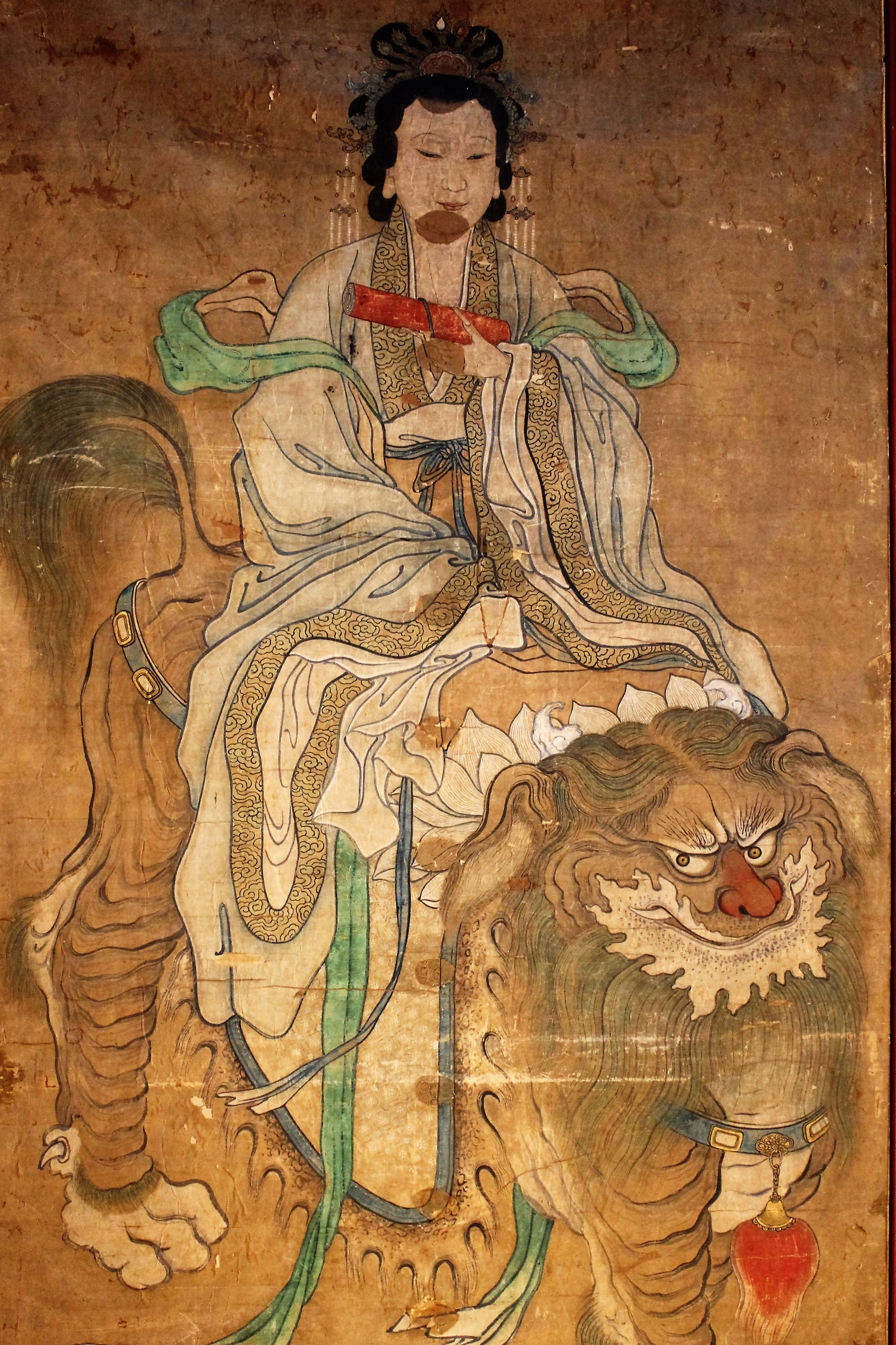
Important Immortal deity painting depicting Xi Wangmu, the Queen Mother of the West, d. Ming dynasty.

In present day China, the Sanxing and other Chinese folk deities continue to be perceived as powerful carriers of good fortune. The Queen Mother of the West, Xi Wangmu, who is often figured in Chinese stories, is associated with symbols of longevity in Chinese arts as the peaches of immortality are believed to grow in her celestial peach orchard according to folklore stories.

=== Taoist symbols ===
Name		Images
Bagua		
Hetu		
Luoshu		
Taiji		
Taijitu		
Trigram figure	lí (離)	
Wuji		
Yin and Yang		

== Buddhism religion ==
=== Buddhist entities ===
Types		Name	Images
Spirits	Female	Feitian (Apsara)	

== Borders/ meander, and repeated patterns ==
Types			Name	Images
Chinese characters		Border	Gong (工; work) and bats	
Decorative	Floral and twines	Grass pattern	Tang caowen	
Decorative	Floral and twines	Twined branches	Chanzhiwen	
Decorative	Curves	Pommel pattern	Guri (屈輪) / Pommel scroll	
Geometric	Diagonal	Diagonal straight lines	Lishui	
Geometric	Diagonal	Diagonal wavy lines	Lishui	
Geometric	Semicricles	Horizontal semi-circles	Woshui	
Geometric	Curvilinear	Swirl		
Geometric	Wavy	Wavy	Boqu	
Geometric	Others	Yunleiwen ( 云雷纹)/ Cloud-and-thunder pattern (meander)	Yunleiwen	
Geometric	Others	Yunwen (云纹) / Cloud patterns (meander)	Yunwen	
Geometric	Others	Leiwen (雷纹)/ Thunder patterns (meander)	Leiwen	
Composite		Floral and coin pattern		

== Related concepts ==
- Five blessings
- Chinese numerology
- Five colours
- Yansheng coins

== See also ==
- Chinese ornamental gold silk
- Chinese embroidery
- Chinese auspicious ornaments in textile and clothing

== Bibliography ==
- Eberhard, Wolfram (1986). A dictionary of Chinese symbols: hidden symbols in Chinese life and thought. London: Routledge & Kegan Paul. ISBN 978-0-203-03877-2. OCLC 826514710.
- Ren, Liqi (2013). Traditional Chinese visual design elements: their applicability in contemporary Chinese design (Master of Science in Design thesis). Arizona State University.
- Welch, Patricia Bjaaland (2012). Chinese art: a guide to motifs and visual imagery. Boston, US: Tuttle Publishing. ISBN 978-1-4629-0689-5. OCLC 893707208.
- Williams, Charles (2006). Chinese symbolism and art motifs: a comprehensive handbook on symbolism in Chinese art through the ages. New York: Tuttle Pub. ISBN 978-1-4629-0314-6. OCLC 782879753.
