= Sun Long =

Sun Long may refer to:

- Sun Long (painter), Chinese landscape painter
- Sun Long (speed skater) (born 2000), Chinese speed skater
