= Flowers of the Four Seasons =

Grouping of flowers in Chinese culture

The Flowers of the Four Seasons (Chinese: 四季名花, Sìjì Mínghuā) are a traditional grouping of flowers found in Chinese culture that spread to and influenced other East Asian arts.

In Chinese art and culture, the flowers that represent the four seasons consist of:

- (春蘭) Chūnlán – Spring – orchid
- (夏荷) Xiahé – Summer – lotus
- (秋菊) Qiūjú – Autumn – chrysanthemum
- and (冬梅) Dōngméi – Winter – plum blossom

They contain three of the elements of the Four Gentlemen.

== Gallery ==
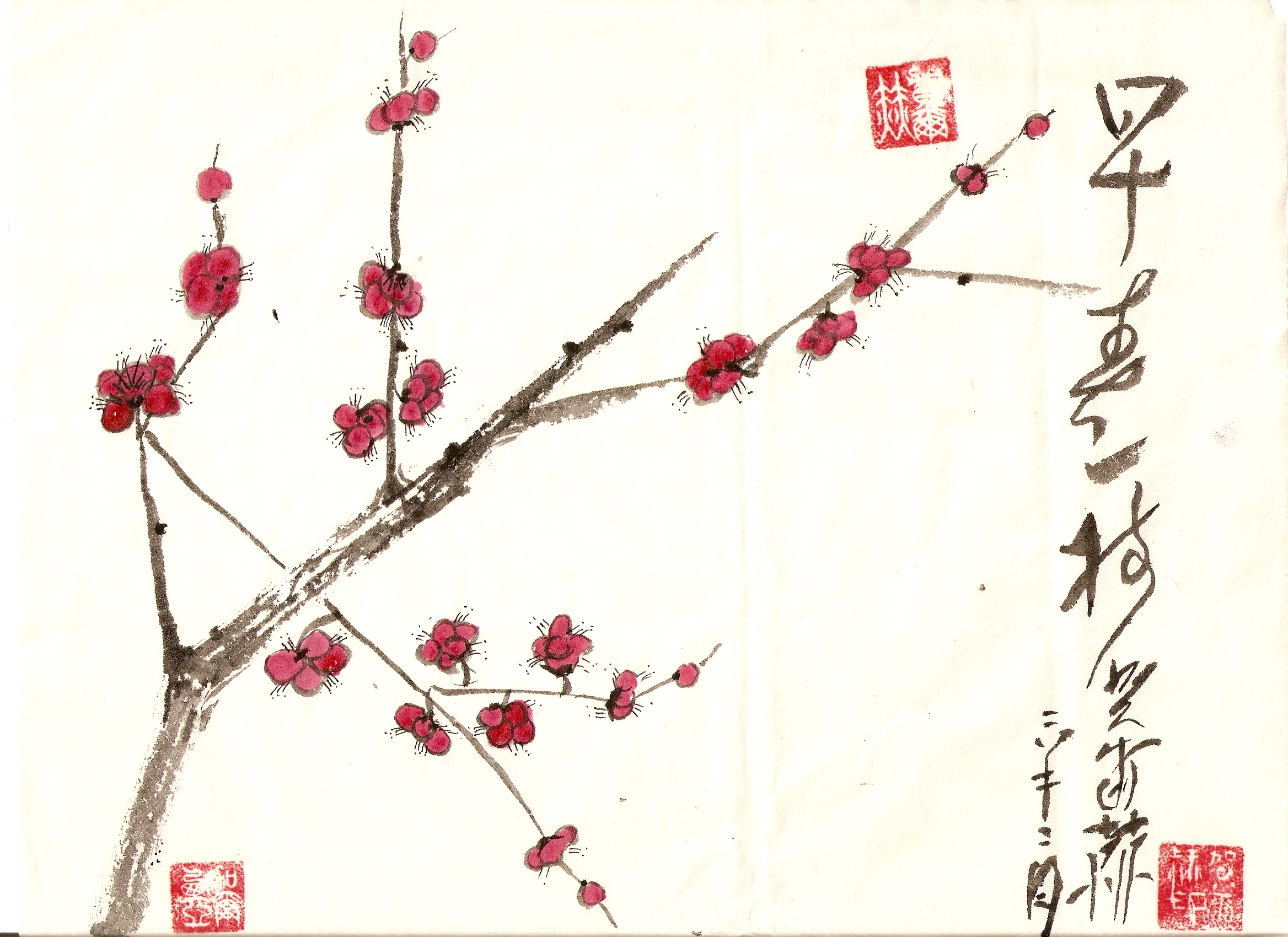
Plum blossoms (contemporary)

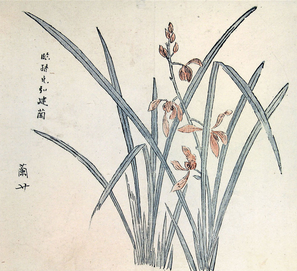
Orchid – Hu Zhengyan (1633)

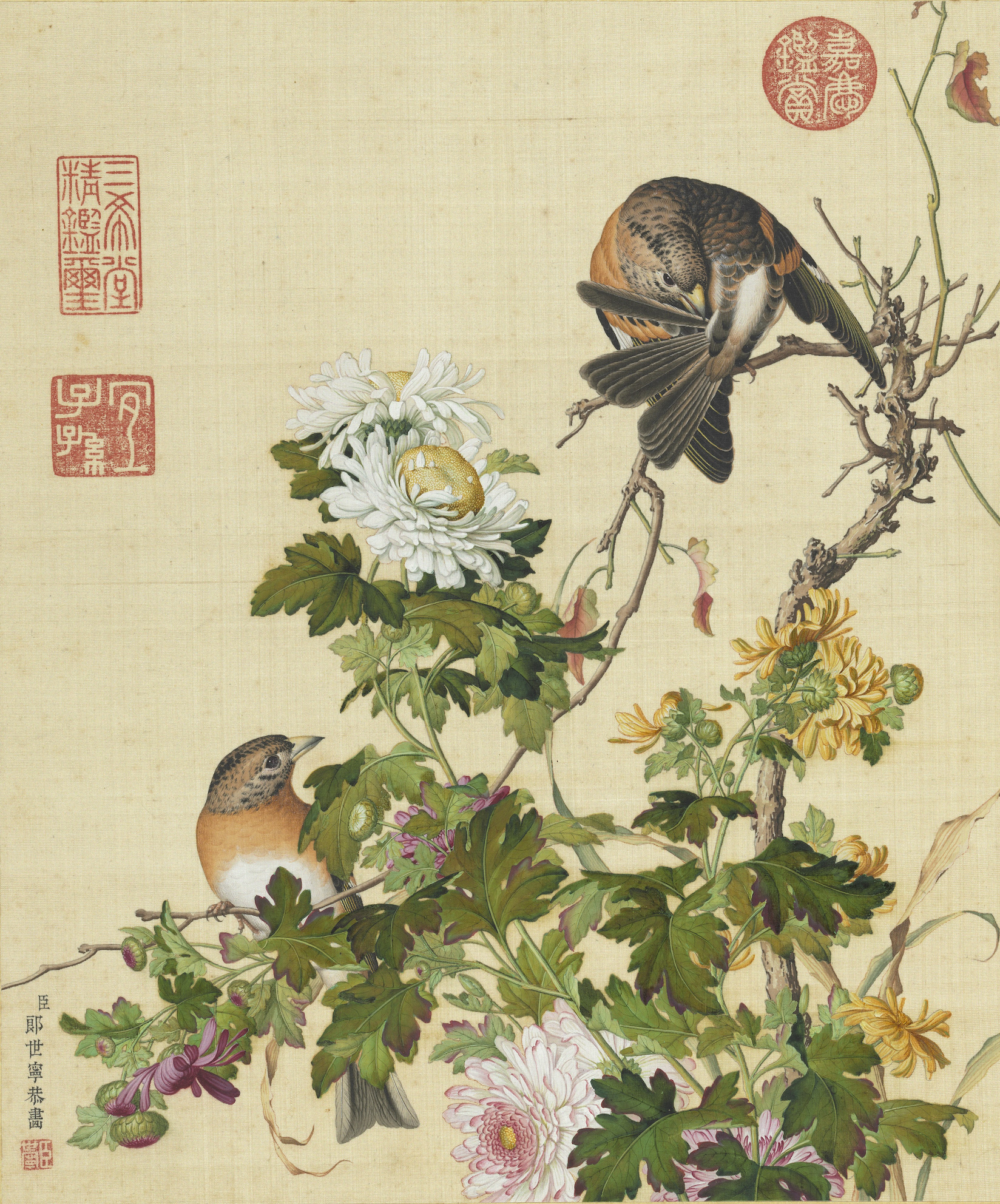
Chrysanthemums from the Xian'e Changchun Album by Giuseppe Castiglione (1688–1766)

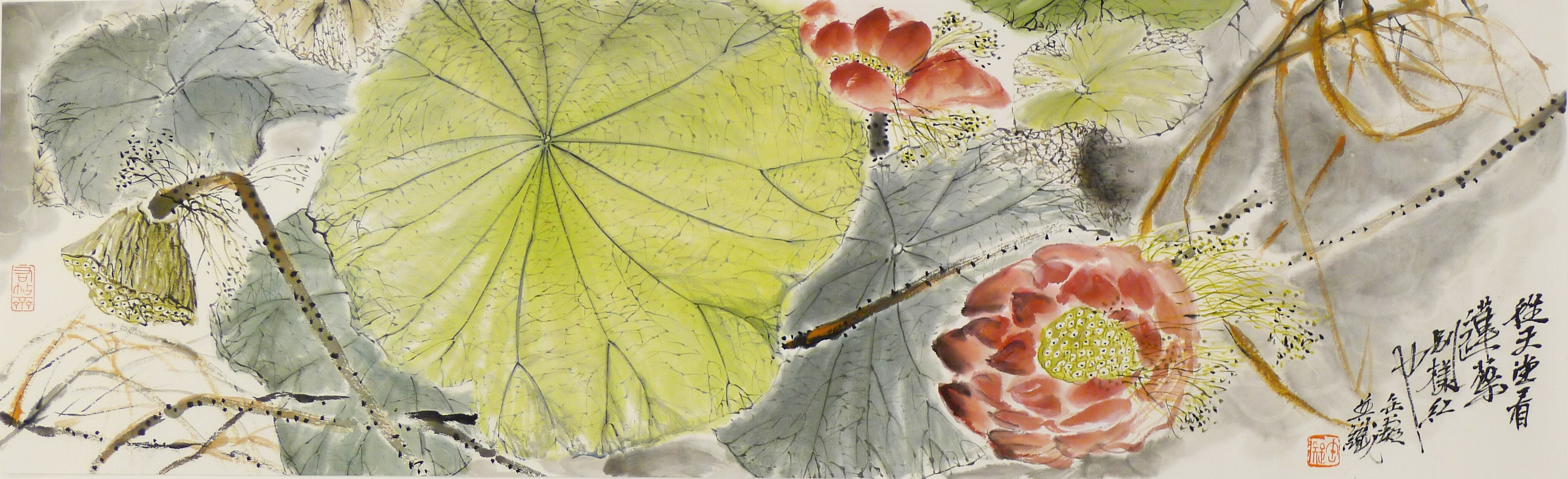
"Elegance of Lotus Looking from Heaven" (contemporary)

== See also ==
- Flower emblems in China
- Flower emblems in Vietnam
- Three Friends of Winter
- List of Chinese symbols, designs, and art motifs

== Notes ==
=== References ===
- Choi, JungBong (2010). "Of the East Asian Cultural Sphere: Theorizing Cultural Regionalization". China Review. 10 (2). The Chinese University of Hong Kong Press: 109–136. JSTOR 23462332.
- Lowe, Roy; Yasuhara, Yoshihito (2016). "Higher learning in ancient Korea, Japan and Vietnam: The East Asian cultural sphere and the Imperial Chinese". The Origins of Higher Learning. Routledge. ISBN 9781315728551.
