= Four Gentlemen =

Four plants in East Asian art

- Chinese: 四君子
Transcriptions
Standard Mandarin
- Hanyu Pinyin: Sìjūnzi
Wu
- Romanization: sy^{3} ciuin^{1} tsy^{2}
Hakka
- Romanization: xi^{55} giun^{24} zii^{31}
Yue: Cantonese
- Jyutping: sei^{3} gwan^{1} zi^{2}
Southern Min
- Hokkien POJ: sì-kun-chú
- Tâi-lô: sì-kun-tsú

In Chinese art, the Four Gentlemen or Four Noble Ones (Chinese: 四君子; pinyin: Sì Jūnzǐ), is a collective term referring to four plants: the plum blossom, the orchid, the bamboo, and the chrysanthemum. The term compares the four plants to Confucian junzi, or "gentlemen". They are commonly depicted in bird-and-flower paintings, a broad category of classical Chinese art, and they are particularly popular subjects for ink wash painting.

The Four Gentlemen are a recurring theme in art because of their long history as symbols of traditional Chinese virtues, such as uprightness, purity, humility, and perseverance despite harsh conditions. Each of them represent a different season (the plum blossom for winter, the orchid for spring, the bamboo for summer, and the chrysanthemum for autumn) and the four are used to depict the unfolding of the seasons through the year.

Together, the Four Gentlemen have been used in Chinese painting since the time of the Song dynasty (960–1279) since the publication of Mixtures Pharmacopeia aka Heji Jufang and were later adopted elsewhere in East Asia by artists in Korea, Japan, and Vietnam. However, their individual meanings have been traced to far earlier times. For example, the first recorded description of bamboo as being a "gentleman" has been credited to the Duke Wu of Qin (697 to 678 BC) from the Zhou Dynasty.

== Korean adaptation ==
The Four Gentlemen (Korean: 사군자; romaja: Sagunja), also translated as the Four Gracious Plants, were depicted in celadon pottery from the Goryeo period (918–1392). As tastes changed within the Joseon period (1392–1897) and blue and white porcelains dominated the royal households, the level of the artistry of depictions in ceramics approached the level of refinement found in ink-wash paintings.

The Four Gentlemen were also frequently used in patterns on mother-of-pearl lacquerware, iron bowls, calligraphy boards, pencil cases, and stone crafts such as inkstones and braziers. Within Korean folk painting (Chinese: 百童子圖; Korean: Baekdongjado):

- Chinese flowering plum or mei (Prunus mume) is associated with winter and has come to symbolize fertility, this is perhaps due to an ancient Chinese custom of throwing plums to seek love.
- Nancho, a native wild orchid, is associated with spring has come to symbolize nobility, loyalty and fidelity.
- Bamboo is associated with summer and likened to a gentlemen's dignity and service to others.
- Chrysanthemums, especially an elixir made from yellow chrysanthemums, is associated with autumn and believed to lead to longevity.

== Gallery ==
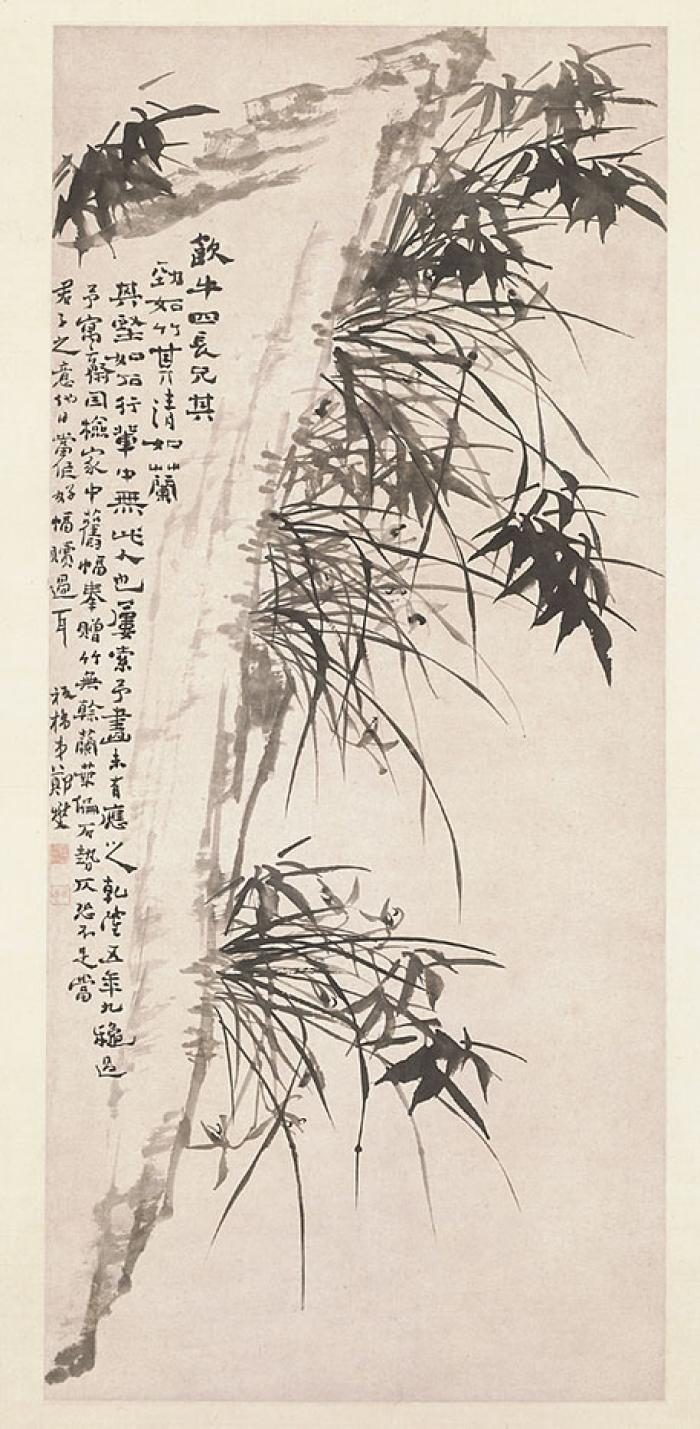
Orchids and Bamboo by Zheng Xie, c. 1740

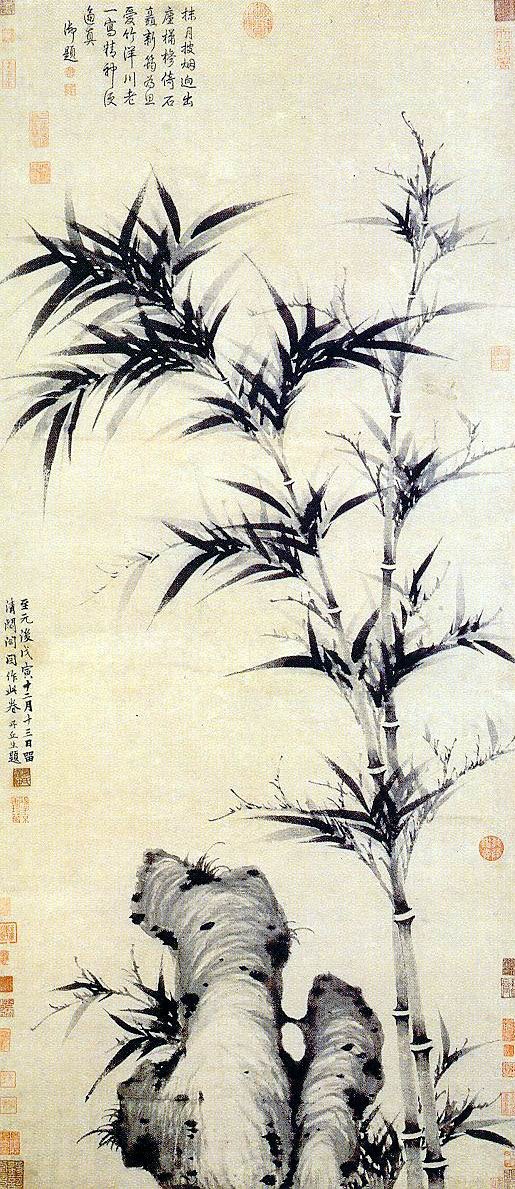
Bamboo at Qingbige Pavilion by Ke Jiusi, c. 1338

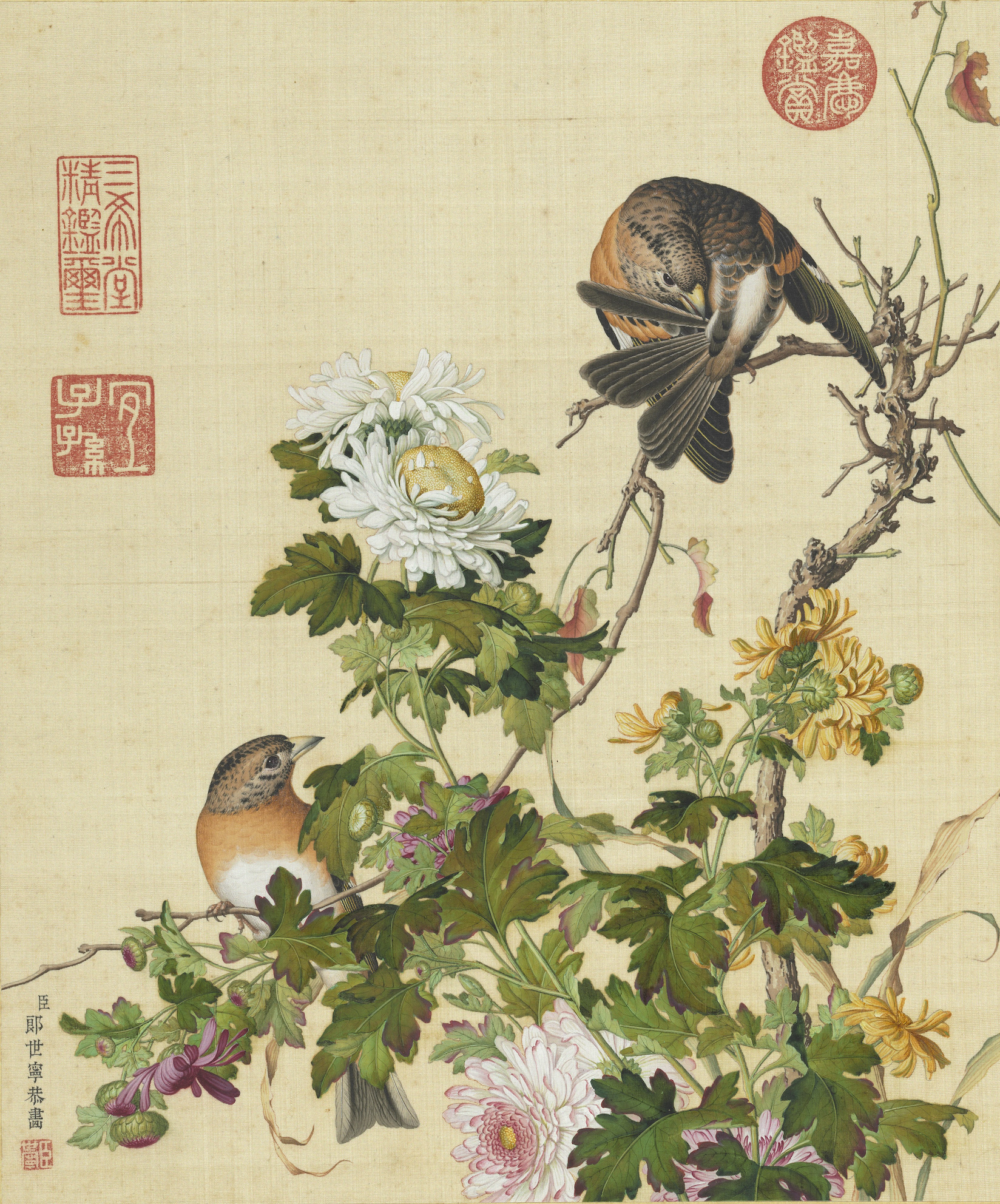
Chrysanthemums from the Xian'e Changchun Album by Giuseppe Castiglione (1688–1766)

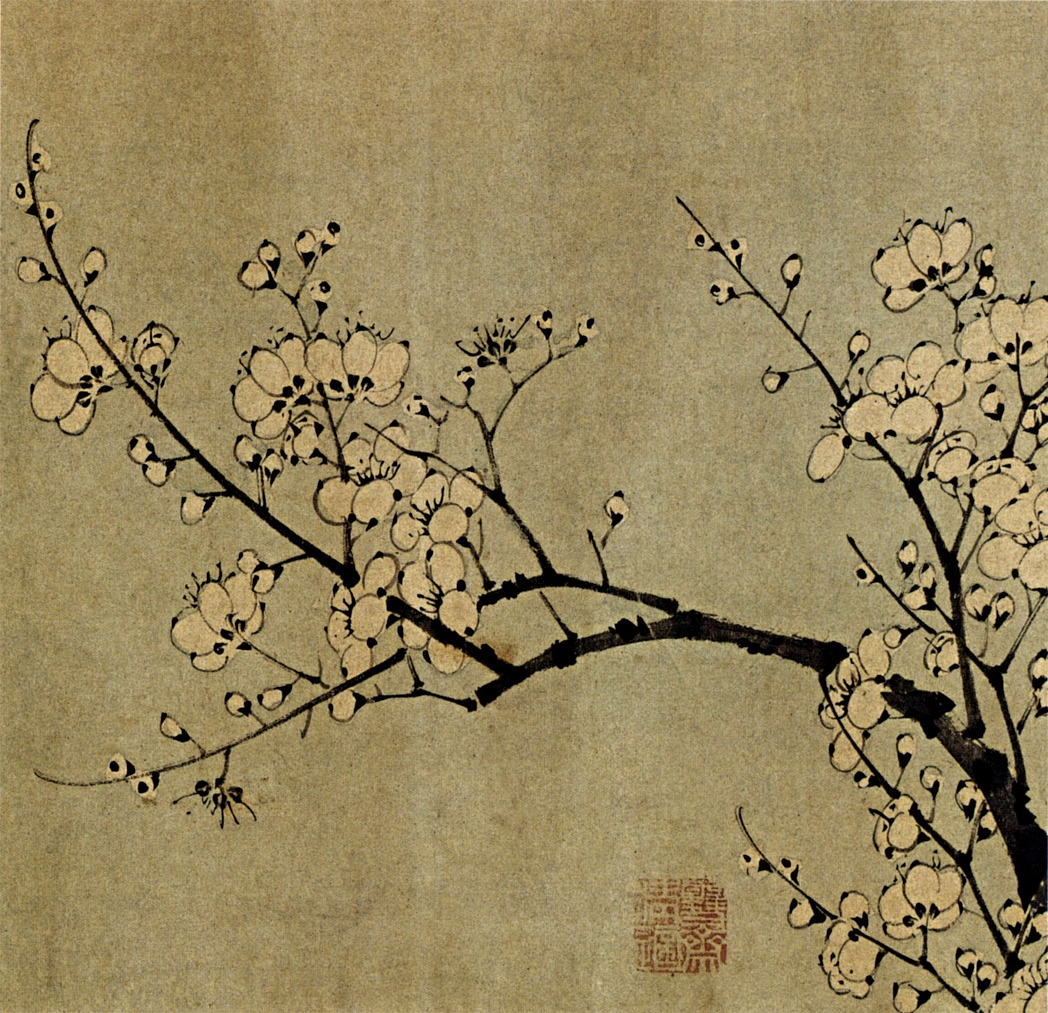
Plum Blossoms by Sun Long and Chen Lu, early Ming dynasty (1368–1644)

Korean Joseon dynasty buncheong ware wine flask depicting bamboo on one side (1600s)

Korean Joseon dynasty buncheong ware wine flask depicting plum blossom (ume) on the other side

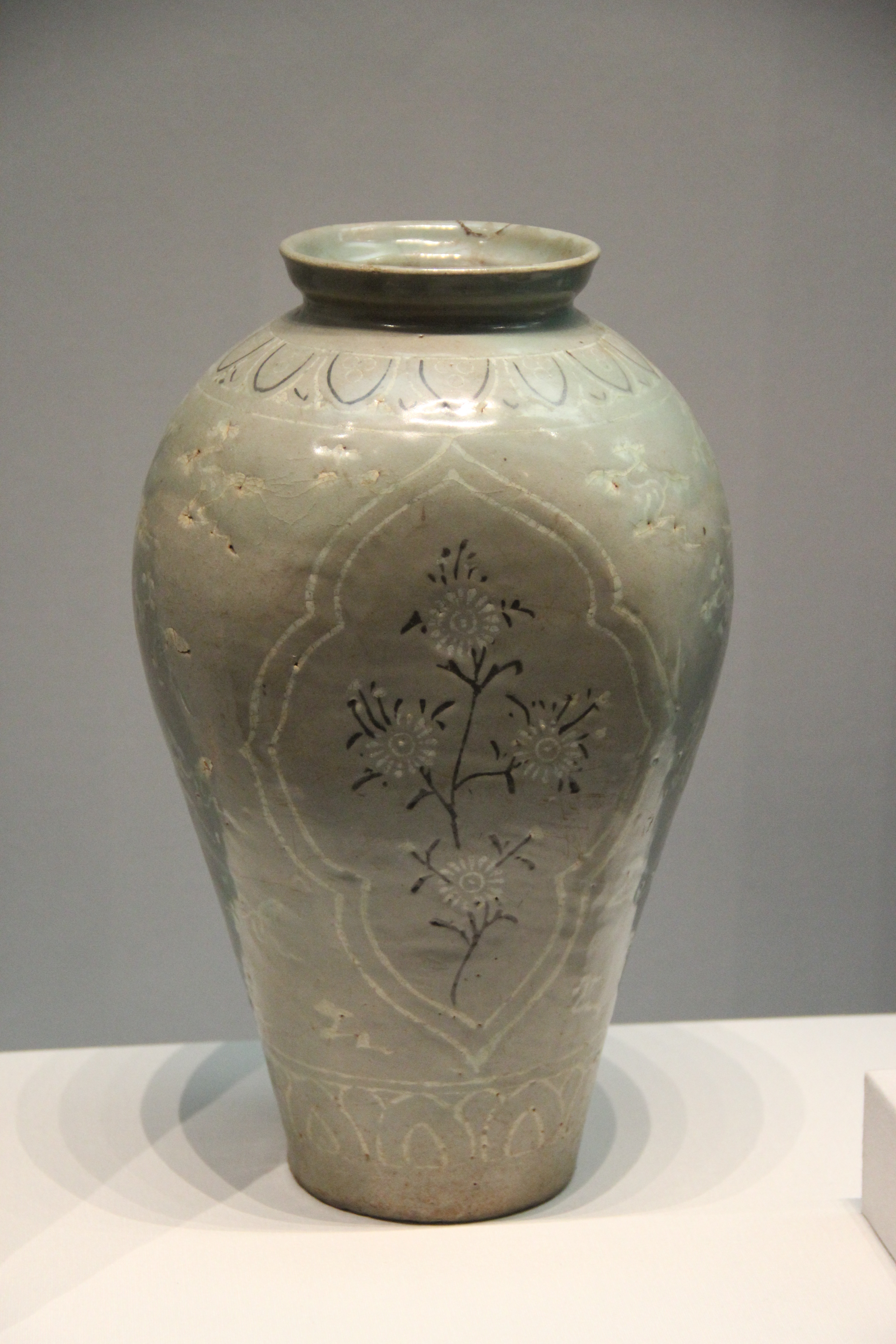
Chrysanthemum on early Goryeo Dynasty celadon vase (918–1392)

== See also ==
- Three Friends of Winter
- Flowers of the Four Seasons
