= Fu (character) =

Chinese character representing prosperity

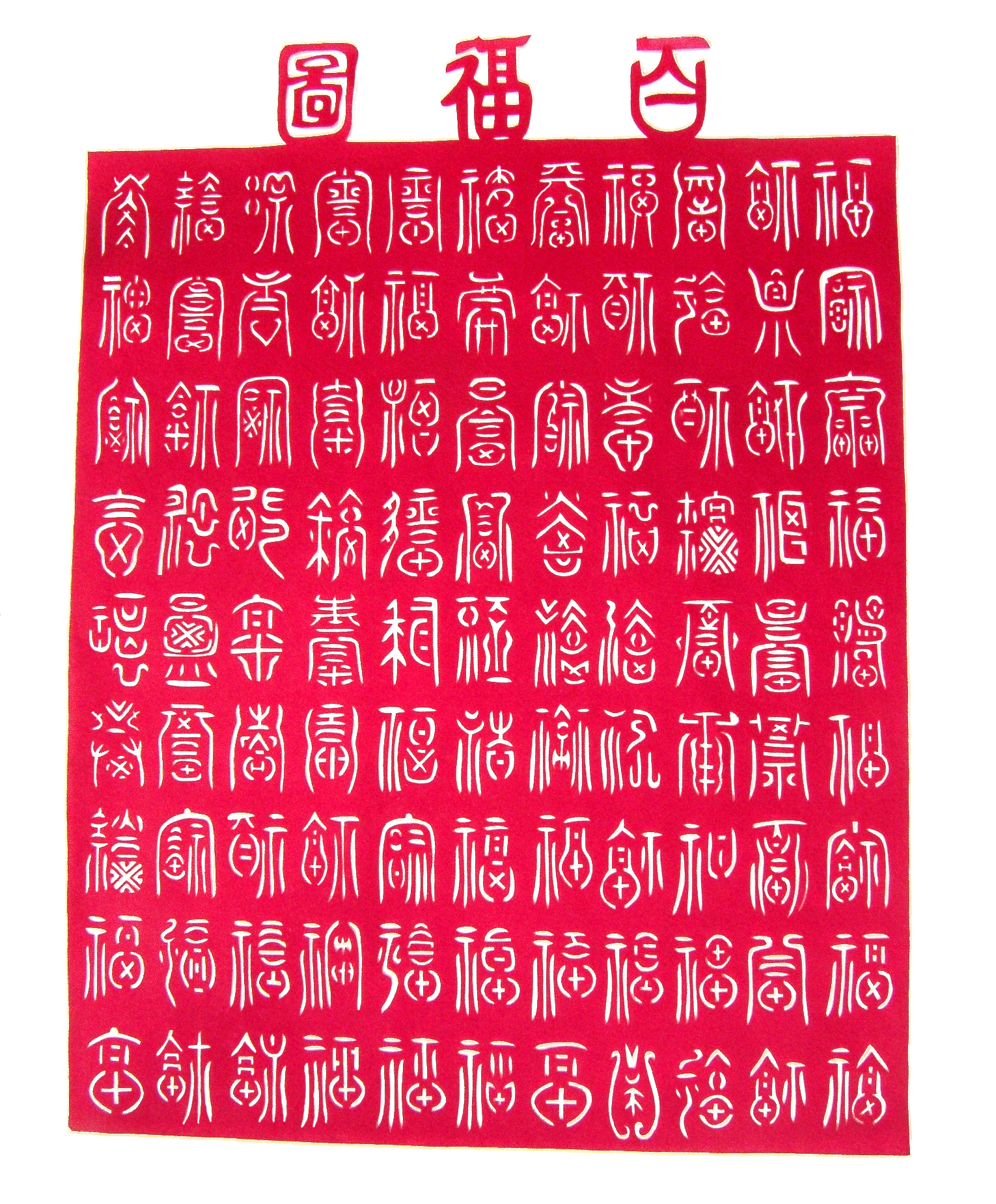
A papercut showing the character 福; fú written in 100 different ways (11 × 9, plus 1)

The Chinese character fu (福; fú), meaning 'fortune' or 'good luck', is represented both as a Chinese ideograph and, at times, pictorially, in one of its homophonous forms. It is often found on a figurine of the male god of the same name, one of the trio of "star gods" Fú, Lù, and Shòu.

Mounted fu are a widespread Chinese tradition associated with Chinese New Year and can be seen on the entrances of many Chinese homes worldwide. The characters are generally printed on a square piece of paper or stitched in fabric. The practice is universal among Chinese people regardless of socioeconomic status, and dates to at least the Song dynasty (960 – 1279 CE).

When displayed as a Chinese ideograph, fu is often displayed upside-down on diagonal red squares. The reasoning is based on a wordplay: in nearly all varieties of Chinese, the words for 'upside-down' and 'to arrive' are homophonous (dào – 倒 and 到, respectively). Therefore, the phrase 'upside-down fu' sounds nearly identical to the phrase 'good luck arrives'. Pasting the character upside-down on a door or doorpost thus translates into a wish for prosperity to descend upon a dwelling.

Another story states that posting the character upside-down originates with the family of a 19th-century prince of the Qing dynasty. The story states that on one Chinese New Year's Eve, the prince's servants played a practical joke by pasting fu characters throughout his royal dwelling. One illiterate servant inadvertently placed the characters upside-down. The prince was said to have been furious upon seeing the characters, but a quick-thinking servant humbly calmed the prince by saying that the occurrence must have been a sign of prosperity "arriving" upon his household by using the above wordplay.

Bats (蝠) are among the most ubiquitous of all Chinese symbols, with the same symbolic meaning as the phono-semantic compound of fu. A less common match is bran (麩子; fūzi), not only because, according to Welch, "depictions of grain have been used throughout Chinese history to represent fecundity", but also in concert with other grains with related homophonous wordplay—for example, lì is a syllable that can refer either to grain (粒) or profit (利).

Usage of fu in various forms, such as in calligraphy, seals, paper crafts, and posters, represents the desire that one's good luck will be expansive and multifaceted. Chinese textiles and ceramics often found transcribe this felicitous message by portraying random numbers of bats in flight, sometimes more than a hundred.

== Encoding ==
Since 2017, version 10 of the Unicode Standard features a rounded version of the character in the "Enclosed Ideographic Supplement" block, at code point U+1F260 🉠 ROUNDED SYMBOL FOR FU.

== Gallery ==
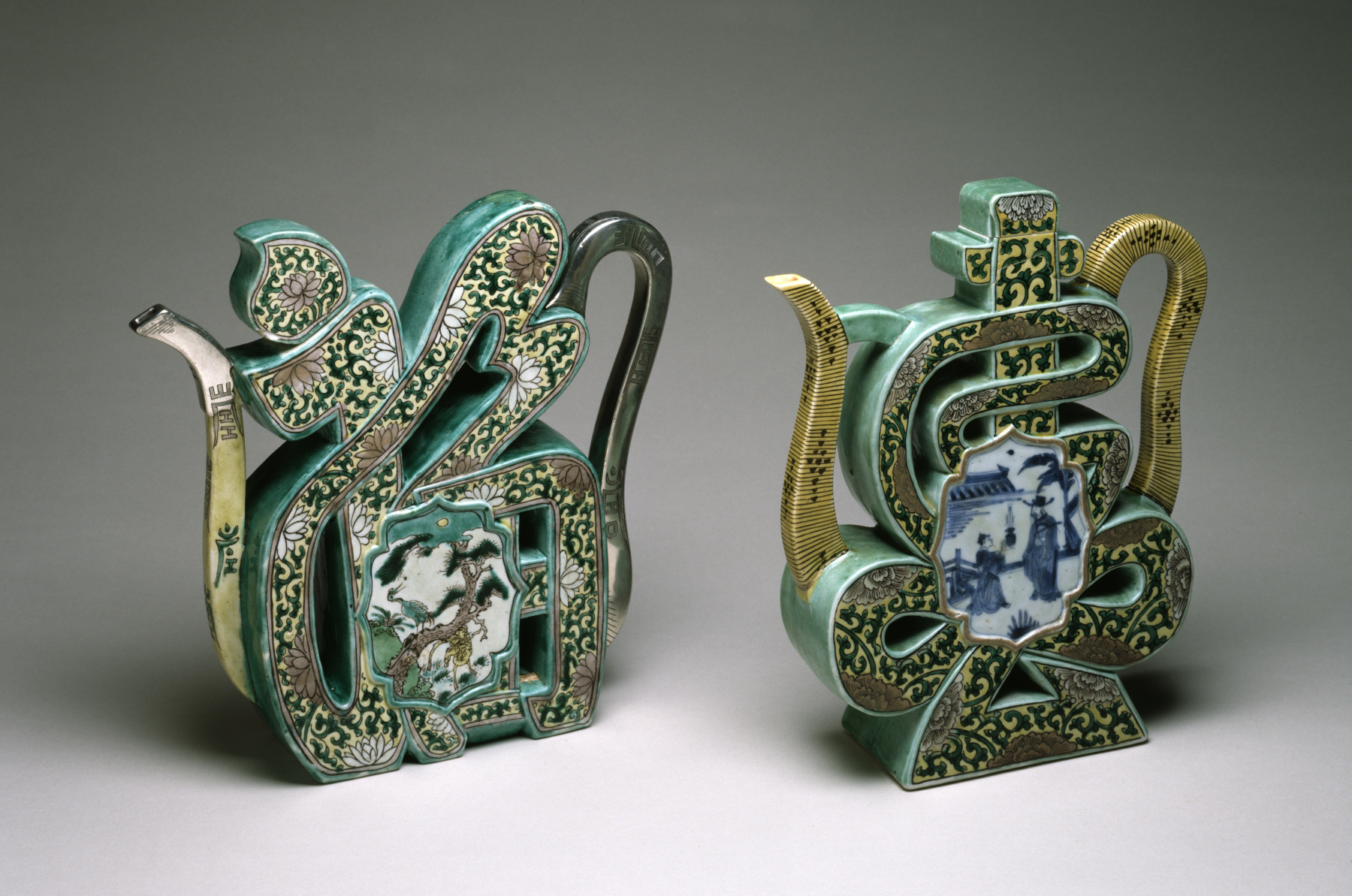
Pair of "Famille Verte" wine pots in the form of 福; fú on the left and the character 壽; shòu on the right

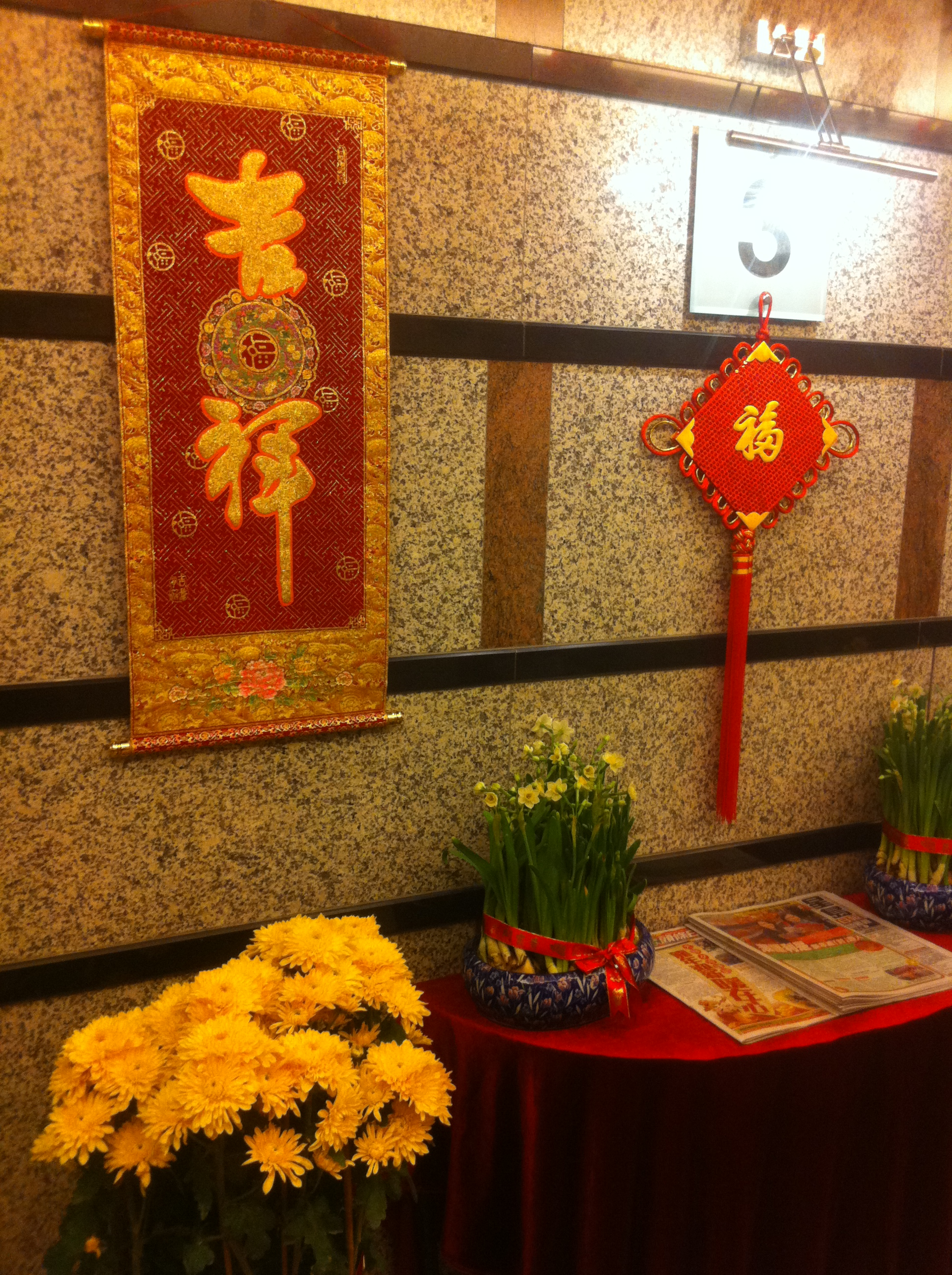
Chinese New Year decorations in Hong Kong, with fu on the Chinese knotting on the right

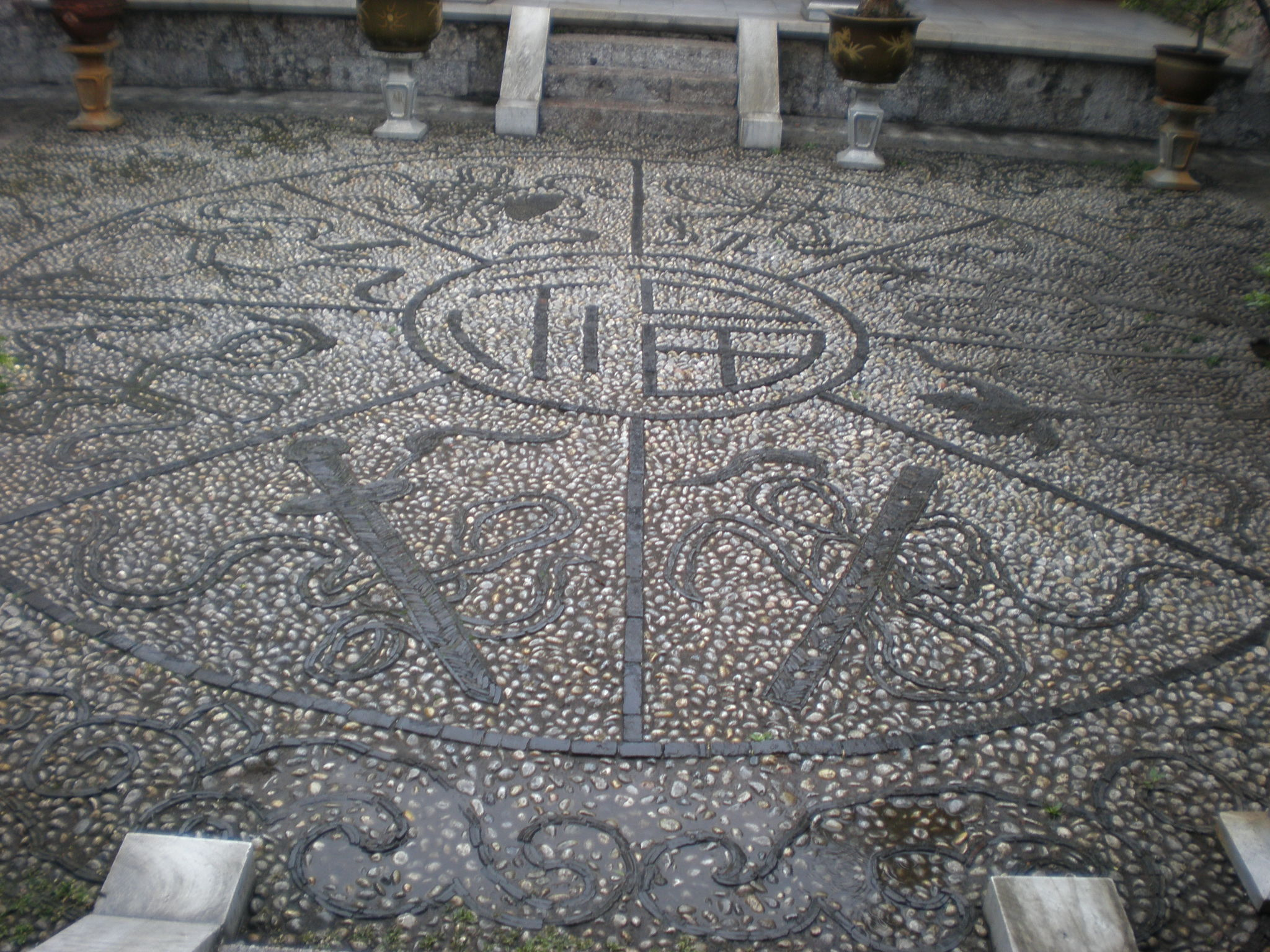
A pebble mosaic in a small inner courtyard of the Mu Mansion, Old Town of Lijiang, Yunnan, with fu in the center

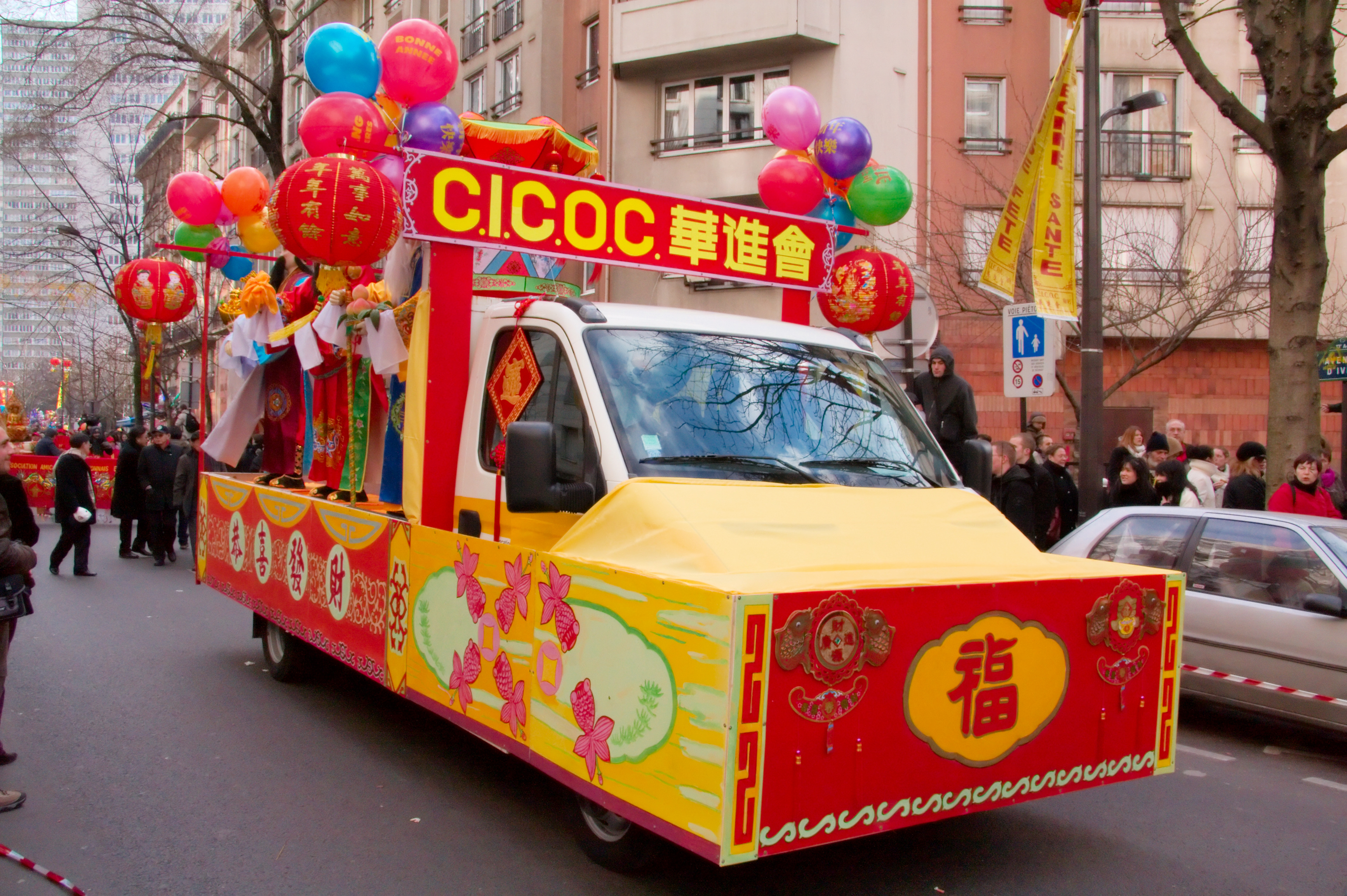
Chinese New Year celebration in the 13th arrondissement of Paris in 2009, with fu in the front of the float

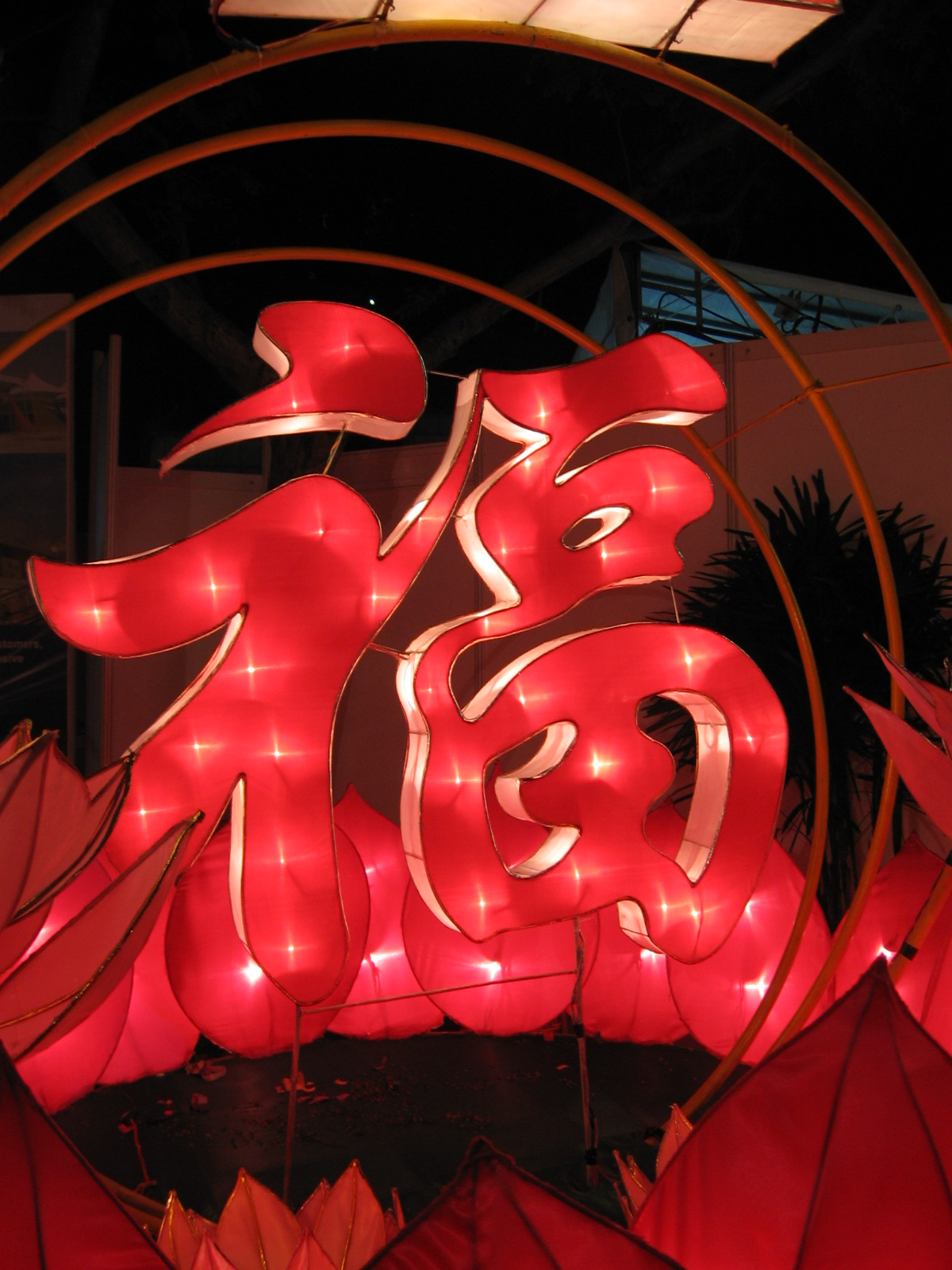
Fu lantern at the Singapore River Hongbao Carnival during the Chinese New Year in 2006

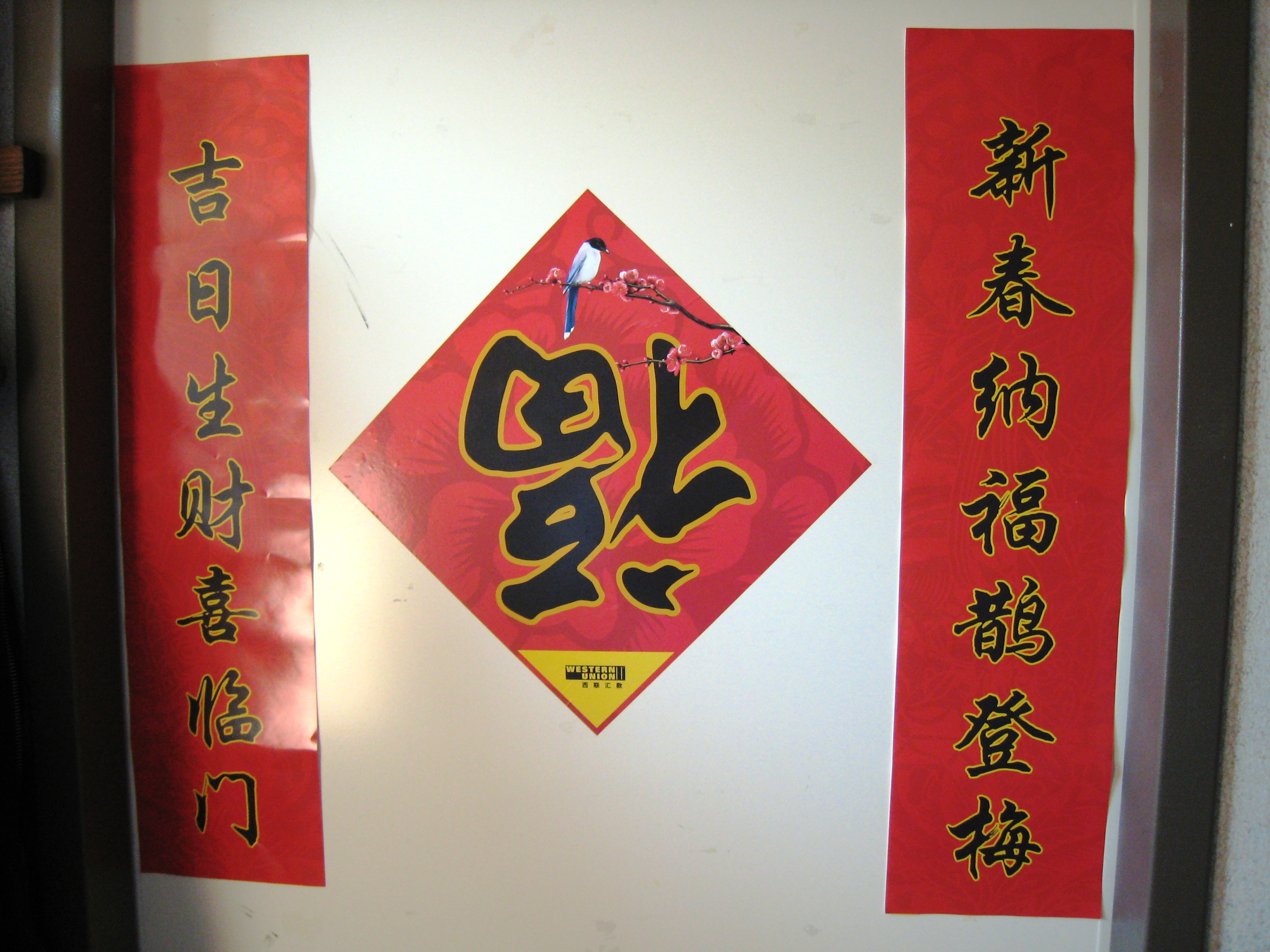
Chinese New Year decorations at Western Union's headquarters in Englewood, Colorado, with the center character, fu, displayed upside-down

== See also ==
- Shou (character) (壽), symbolizing longevity
- Double Happiness (calligraphy) (囍), symbolizing good-luck and happiness
- Homophonic puns in Standard Chinese, of which upside-down fu is one
