= Shou (character) =

Chinese character representing longevity

Shòu (Chinese: 壽; pinyin: shòu) is the Chinese word/character for "longevity".

== Use ==
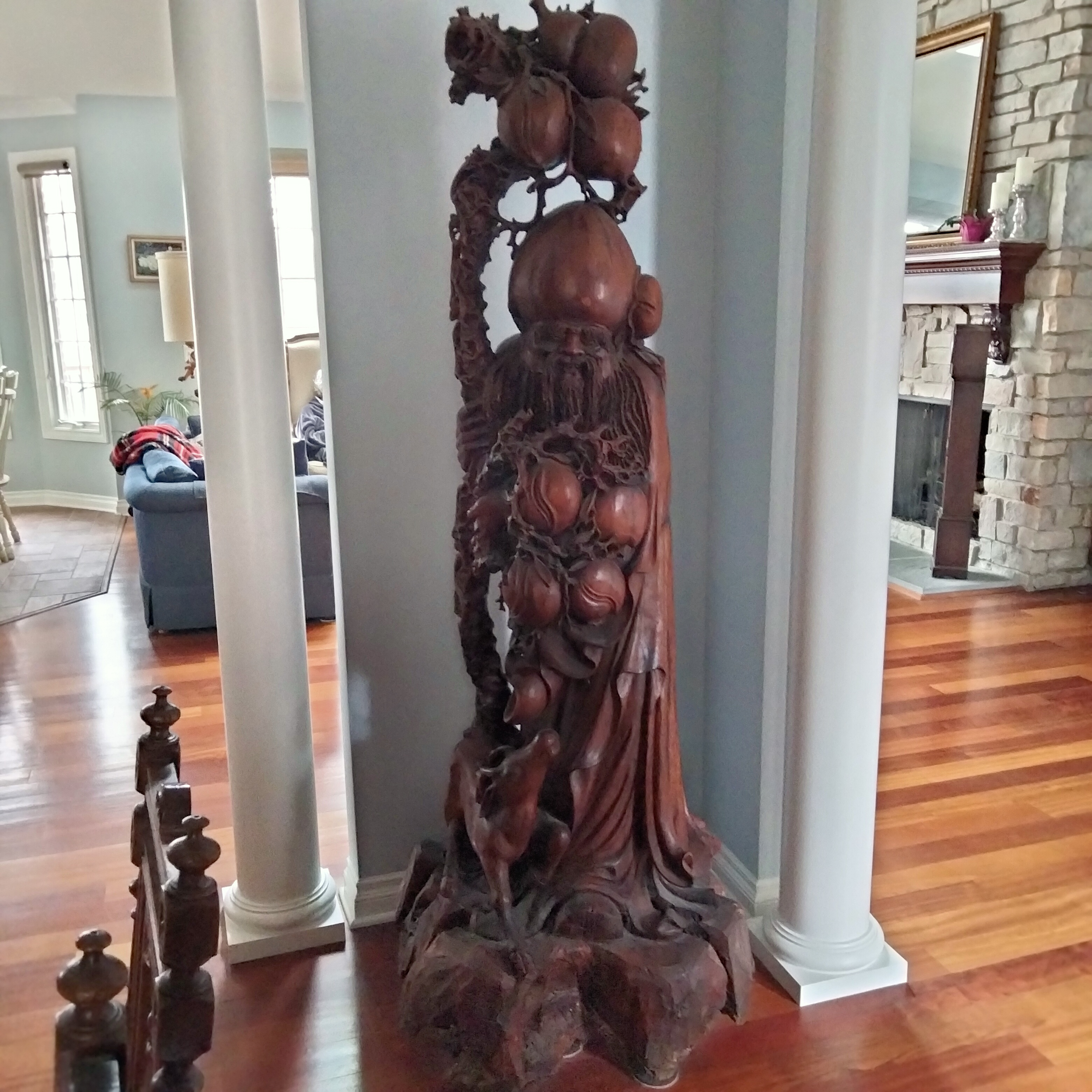
Wooden carving of Shou with all major elements

Three of the most important goals in life in Chinese traditional thought are the propitious blessings of happiness (fú 福), professional success or prosperity (lù 祿), and longevity (shòu 壽). These are visually represented by the three "star gods" of the same names (Fú, Lù, Shòu), commonly depicted as three male figurines (each wearing a distinctive garment and holding an object that enables them to be differentiated), or the Chinese ideographs/characters themselves, or various homophones or objects with relevant attributes. Shòu is instantly recognizable. "He holds in his hand a large peach, and attached to his long staff are a gourd and a scroll. The stag and the bat both indicate fu happiness. The peach, gourd, and scroll are symbols of longevity." His most striking characteristic is his large and high forehead, which earned him the title "Longevity Star Old-pate".

The Chinese character shòu (壽) is usually found on textiles, furniture, ceramics, and jewelry. The ideograph may appear alone or surrounded by flowers, bats, or other good luck symbols, but it will always hold a central position.

Longevity is commonly recognized as one of the Five Blessings (wǔfú 五福 – longevity, wealth, health, love of virtue, a peaceful death) of Chinese belief that are often depicted in the homophonous rendition of five flying bats because the word for "bat" in Chinese (fú 蝠) sounds like the word for "good fortune" or "happiness" (fú 福) or in this case, "blessings". In this arrangement, the shòu ideograph sometimes takes the dominant central position, replacing the fifth bat.

Other symbols in Chinese iconography that represent longevity include pine trees, cranes, spotted deer, special collectors' stones (shòushí 壽石), peaches, and tortoises. These are often depicted in small groupings to emphasize the central, symbolic meaning of the picture (for example, cranes standing amongst pine trees).

Perhaps the most common Chinese auspicious saying concerning longevity is that found on scrolls in nearly every Chinese calligraphy shop in the world: shòu shān fú hǎi (壽山福海), which can be translated as "May your life be as steadfast as the mountains and your good fortune as limitless as the seas".

Since 2017, version 10 of the Unicode Standard features a rounded version of the symbol (🉢) in the "Enclosed Ideographic Supplement" block, at code point U+1F262 (ROUNDED SYMBOL FOR SHOU).

=== In names ===
As a sign for a resonant cultural concept, the character became a part of many Chinese names (e.g., Palace of Tranquil Longevity in Beijing). The Japanese equivalent is Kotobuki 壽; 寿 (see Nakajima Kotobuki, Tsukasa Kotobuki). See also Jurōjin (Shou Laoren) and Fukurokuju.

== Gallery ==
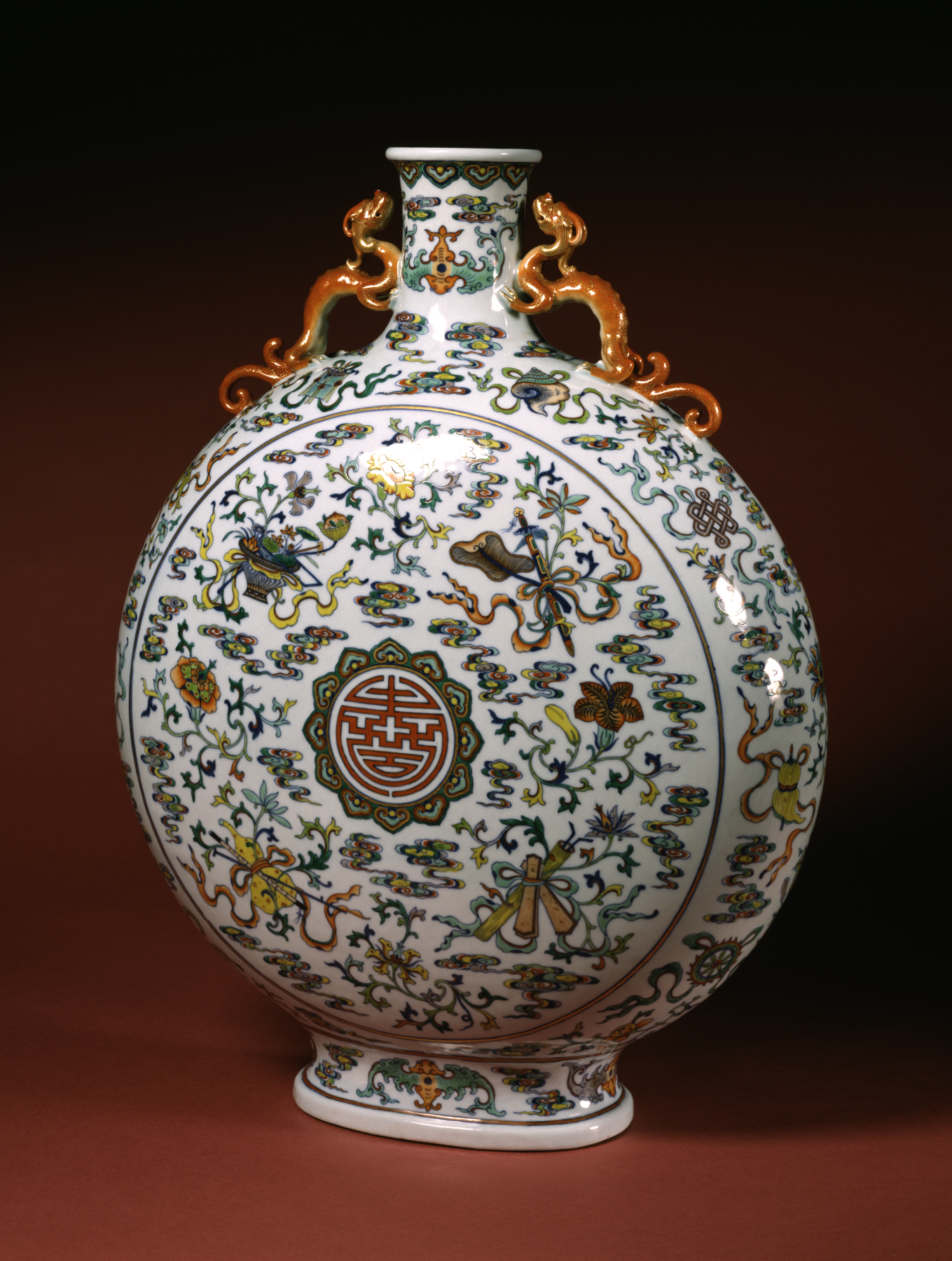
Chinese pilgrim bottle of "famille rose" porcelain with the character Shou

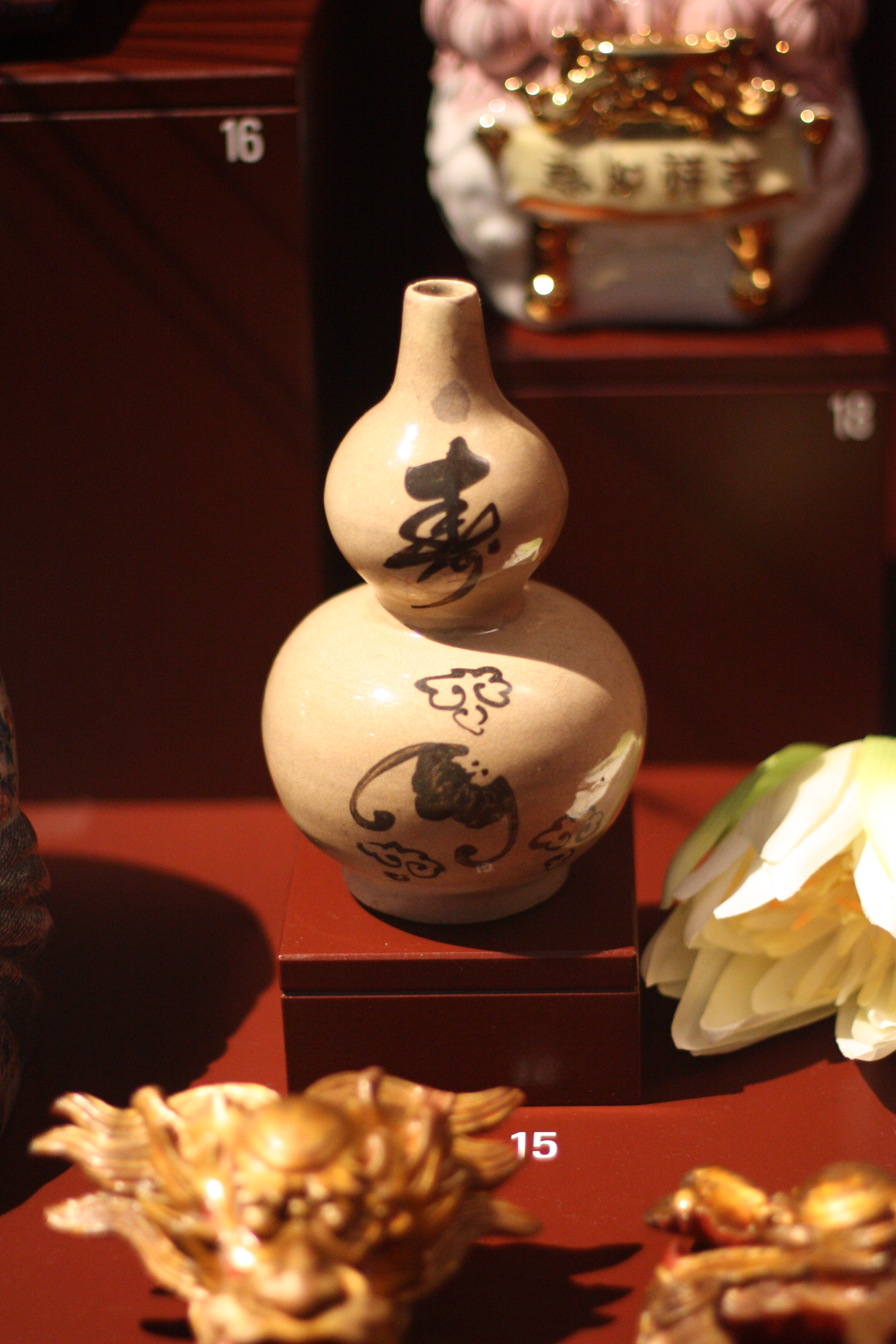
Song dynasty lacquer art hulu with Shou and a bat on it

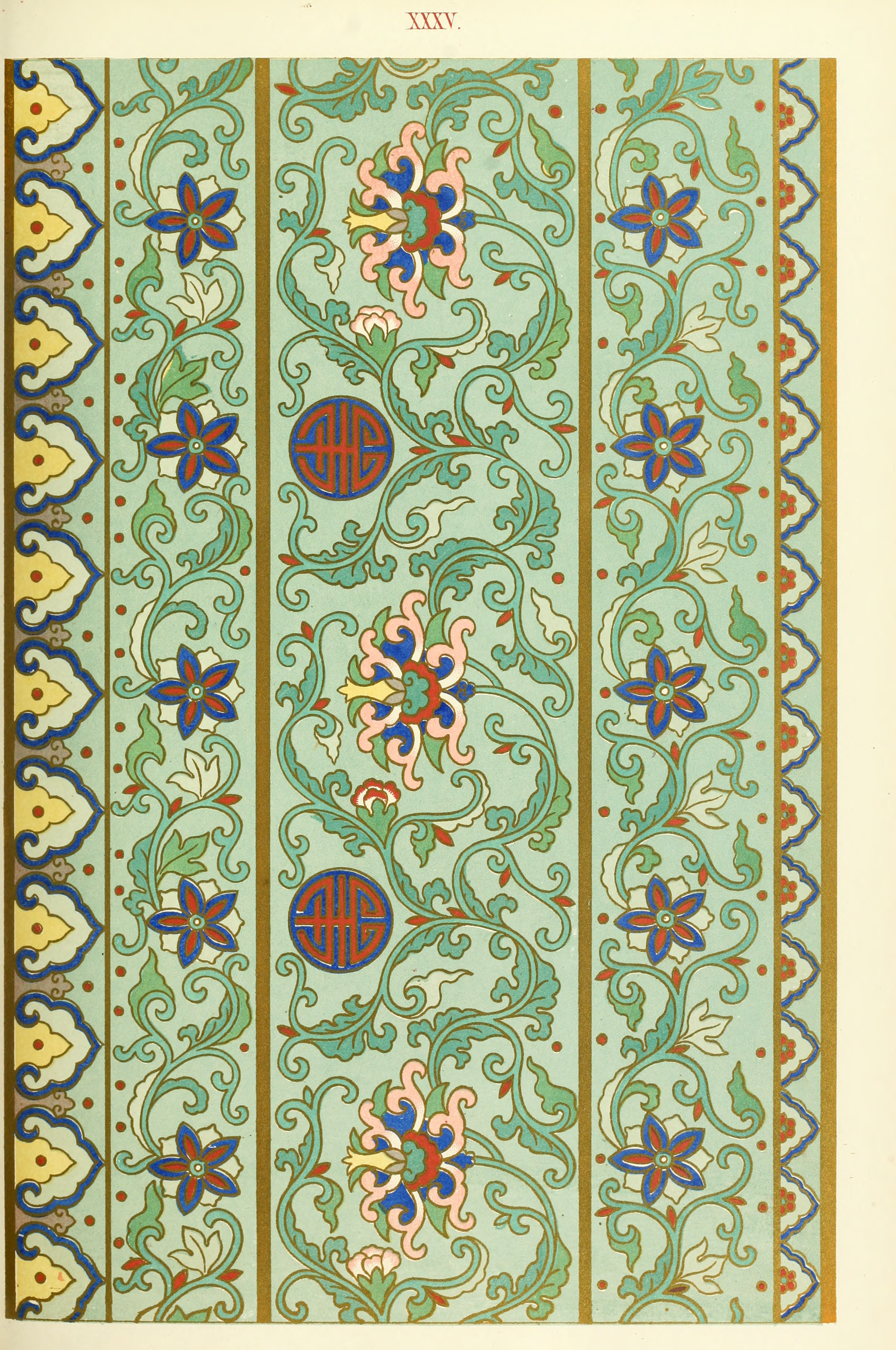
Plate 35 from the book Examples of Chinese Ornament by Owen Jones in 1867. The Shou pattern can be seen.

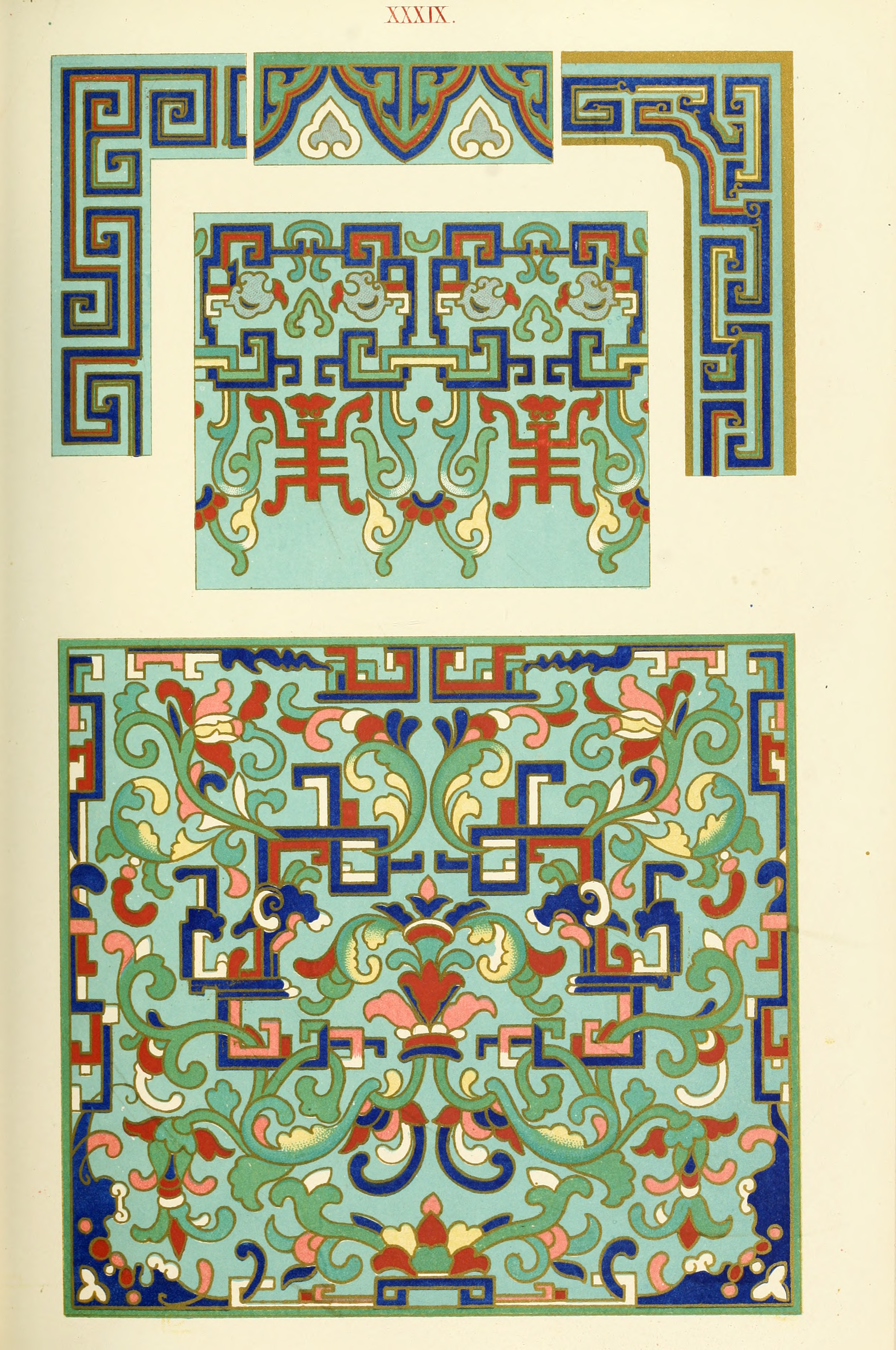
Plate 39 from the same book. The Shou pattern can be seen.

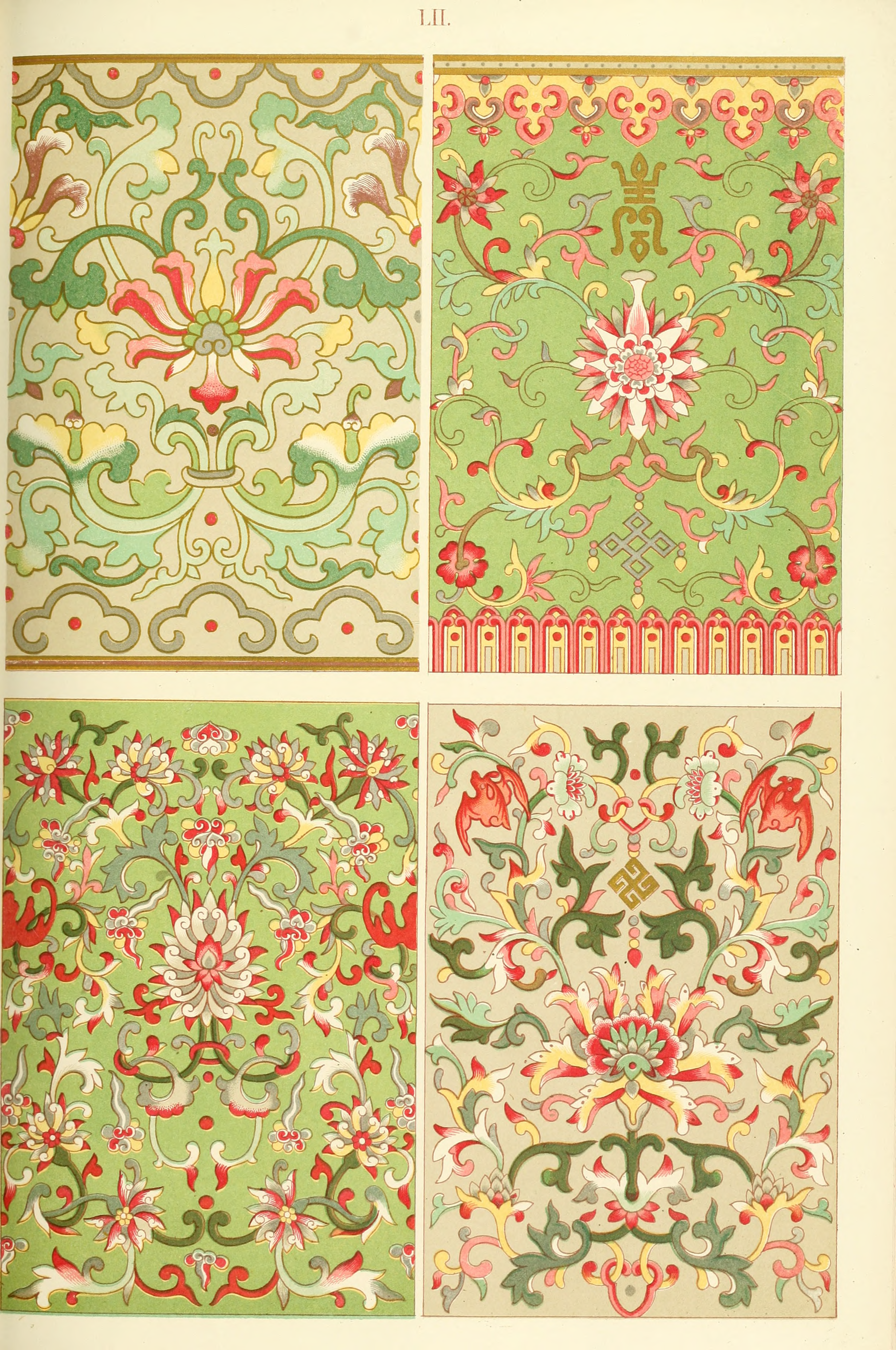
Plate 52 from the same book. The Shou pattern can be seen.

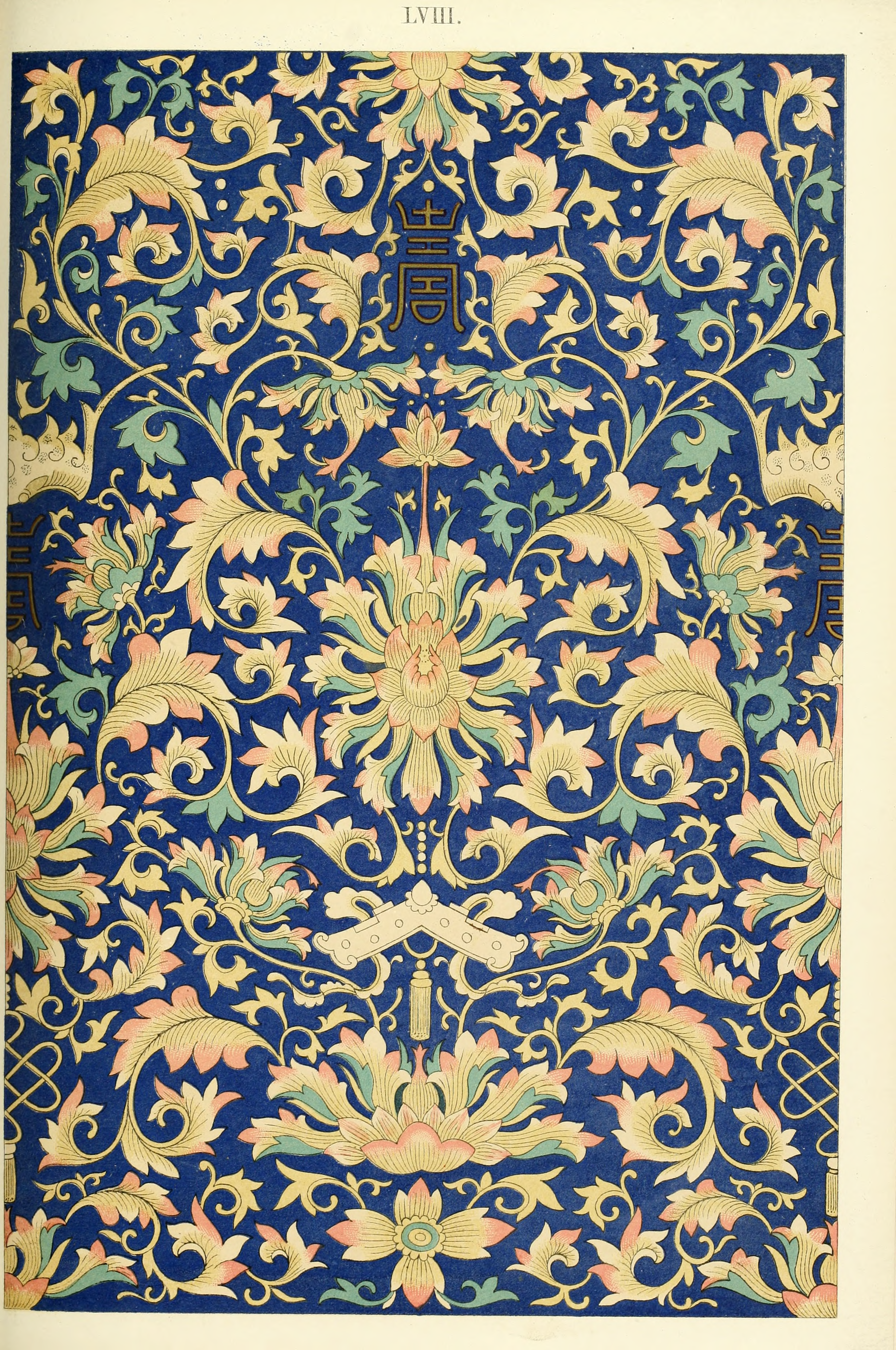
Plate 58 from the same book. The Shou pattern can be seen.

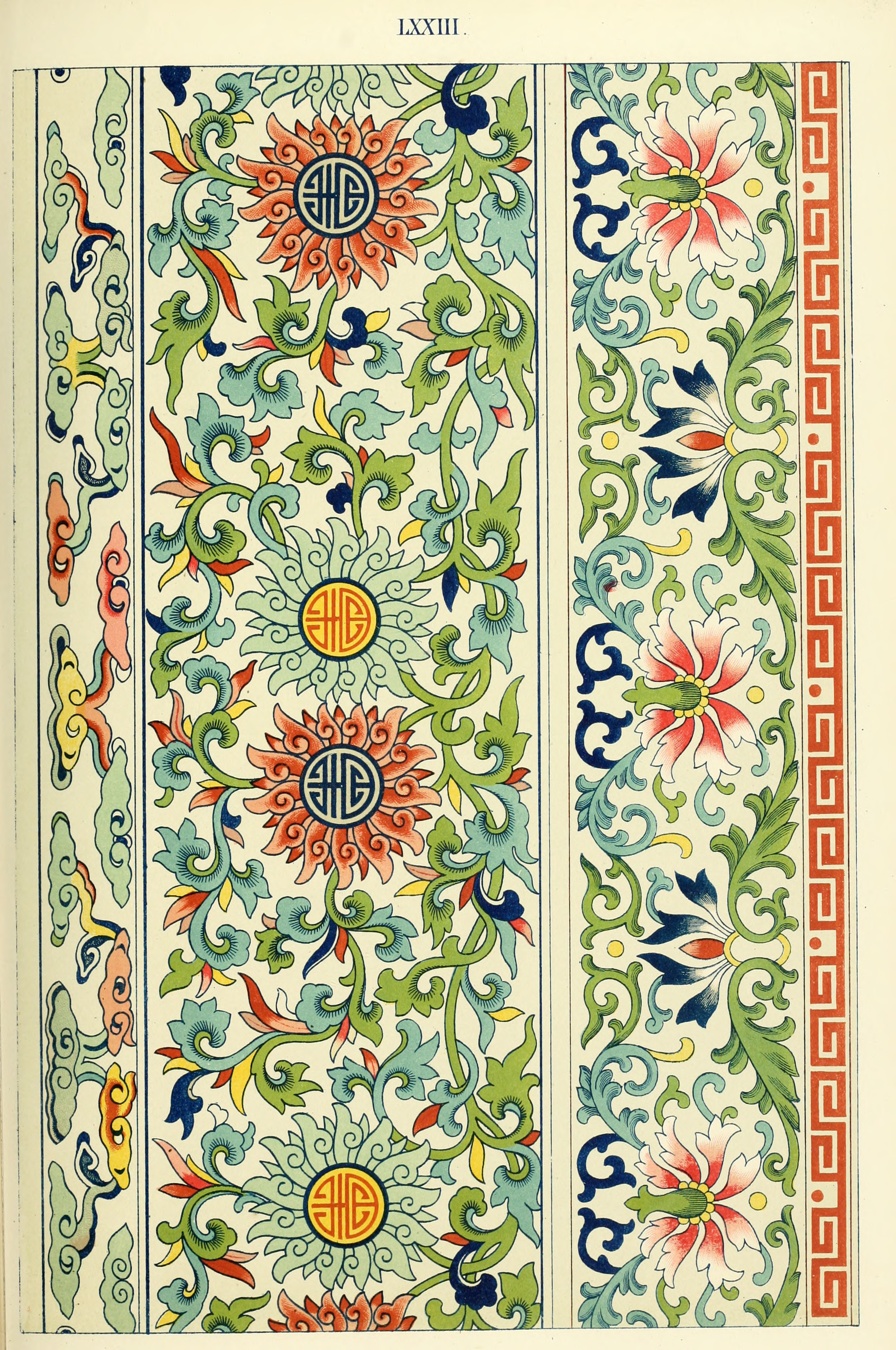
Plate 73 from the same book. The Shou pattern can be seen.

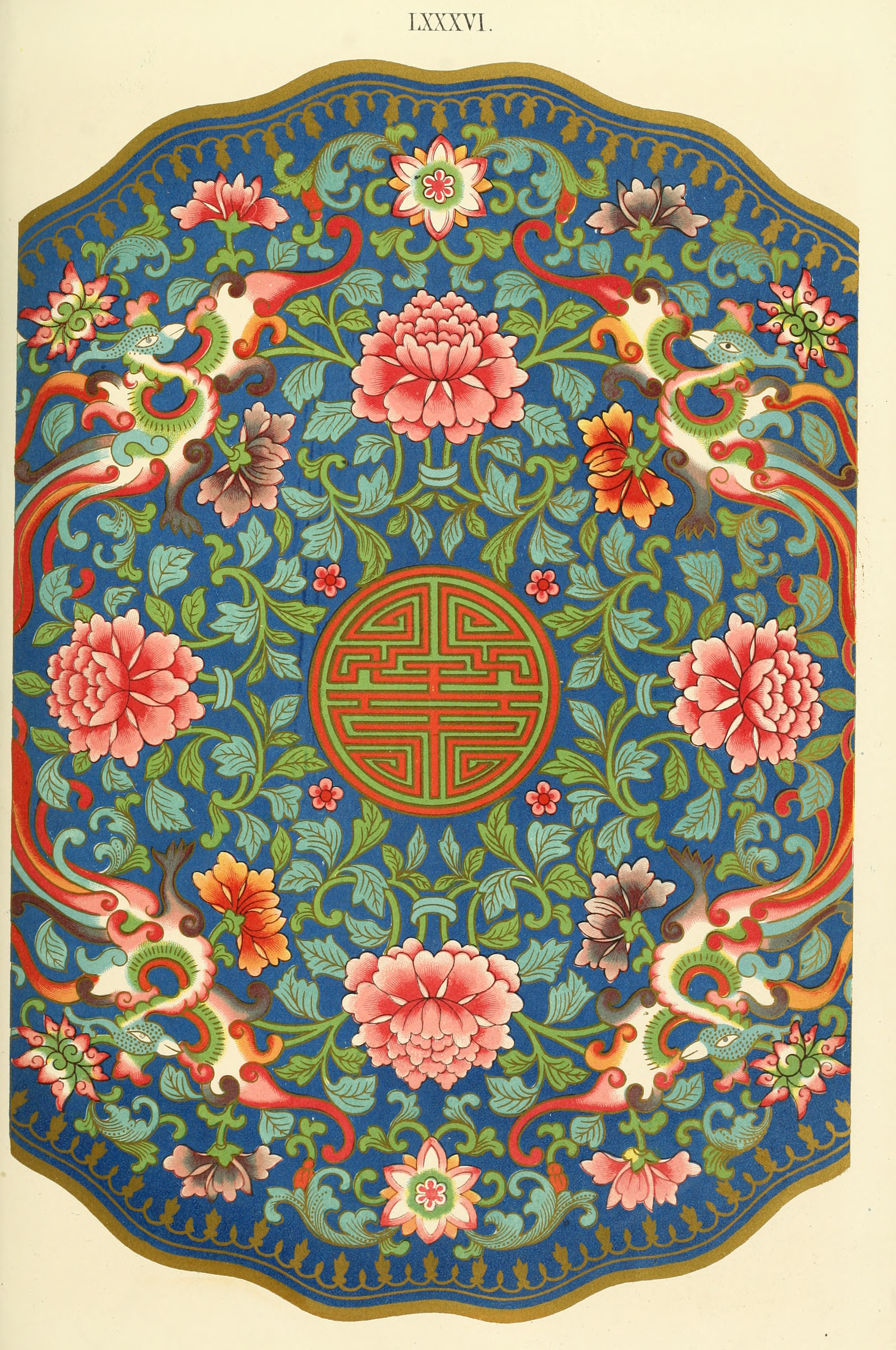
Plate 86 from the same book. The Shou pattern can be seen.

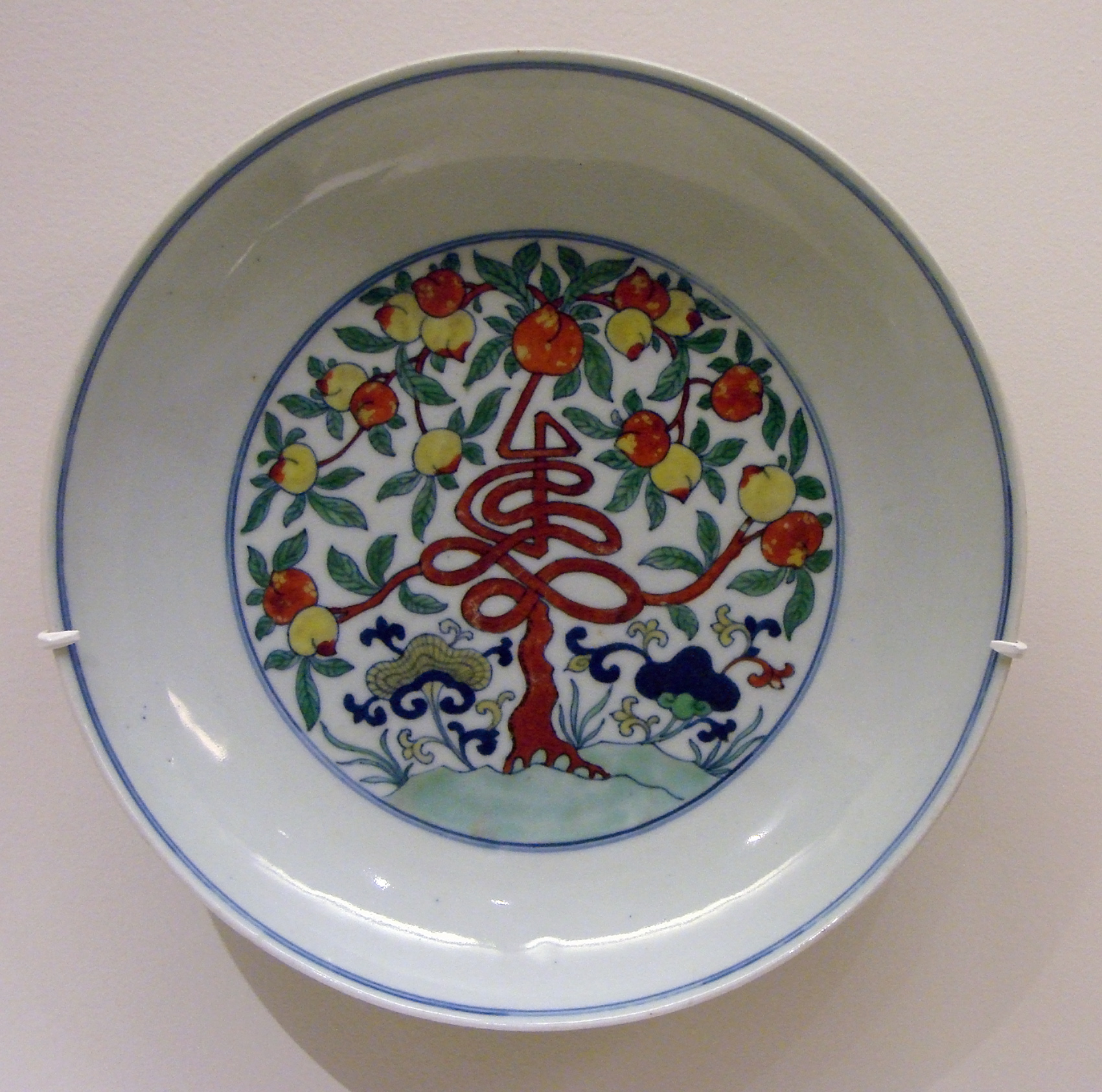
Porcelain dish with a peach tree in the form of Shou, from the Kangxi period in the Qing dynasty

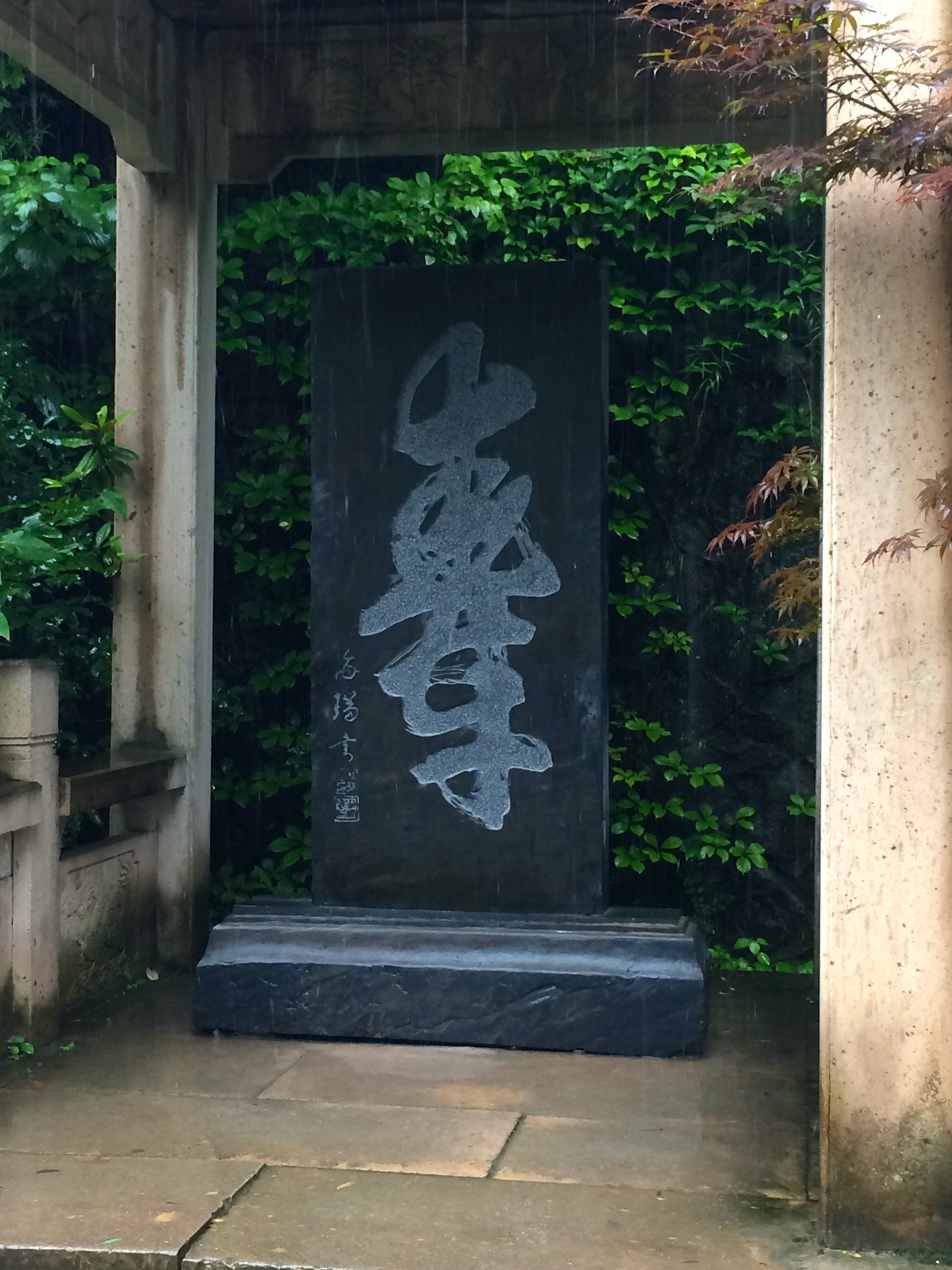
Shou character written by Hai Rui at Qiandao Lake. The character can be viewed either right-side up or upside down to read "Shou".

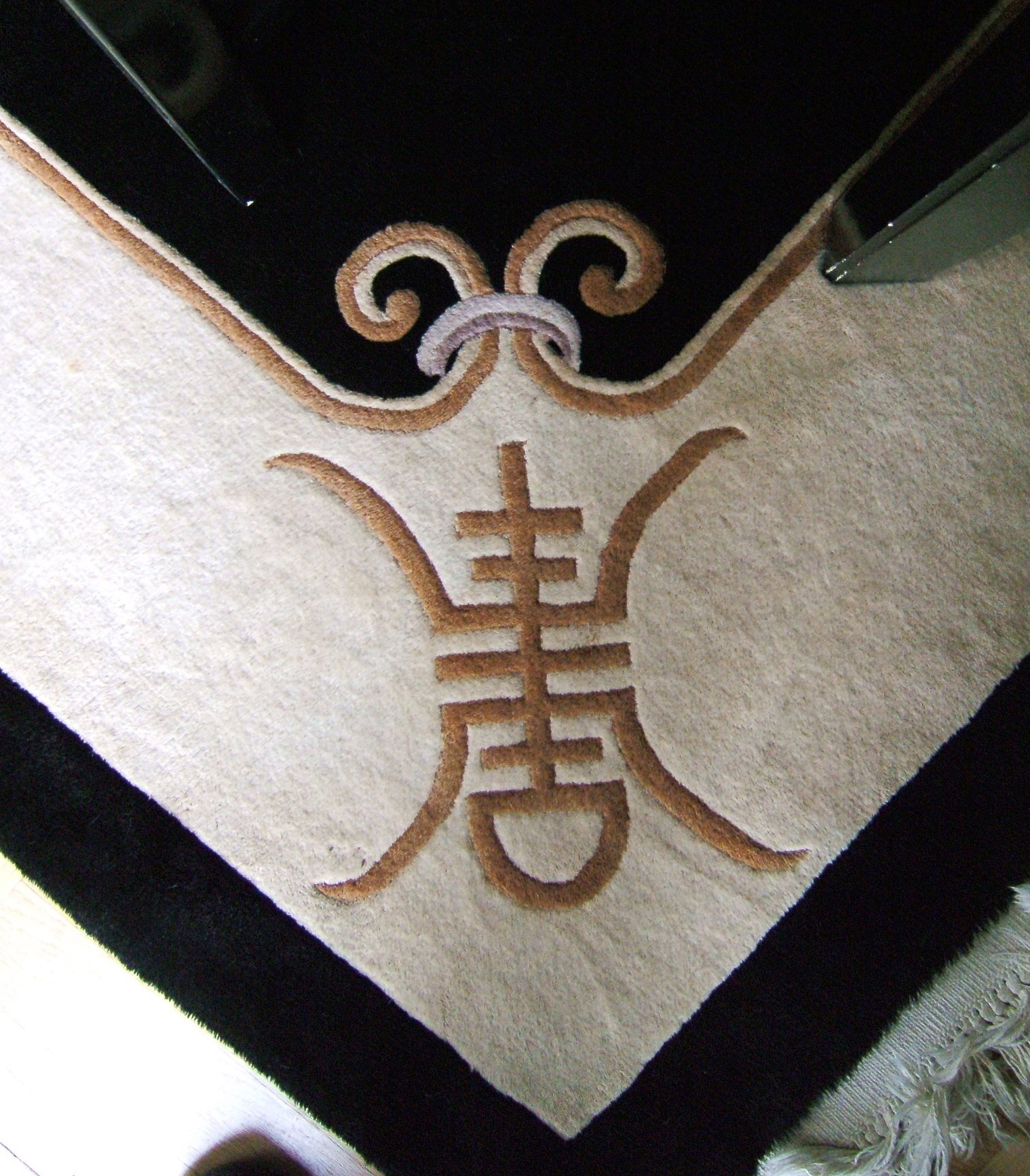
Modern carpet

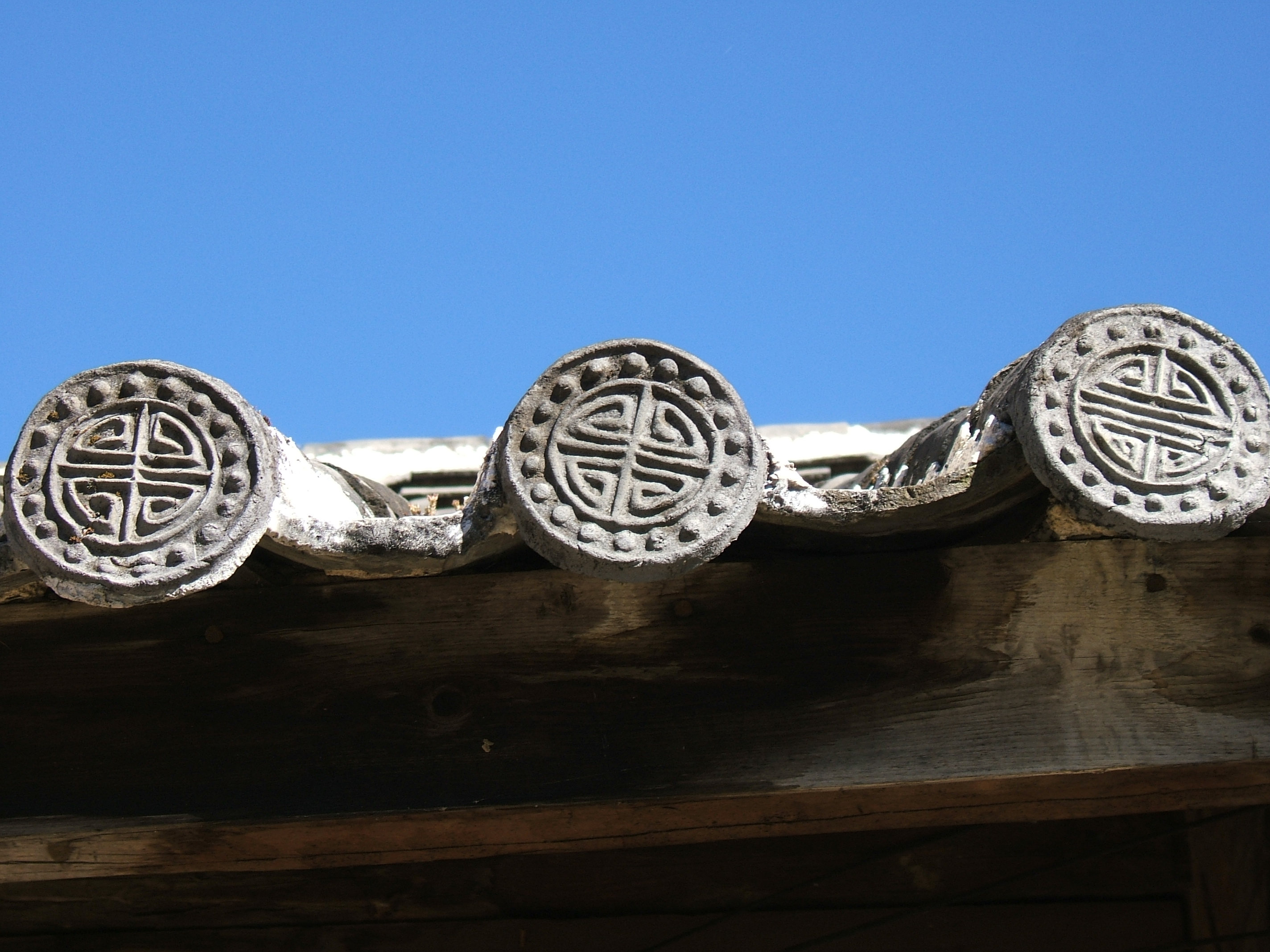
Roof tiles

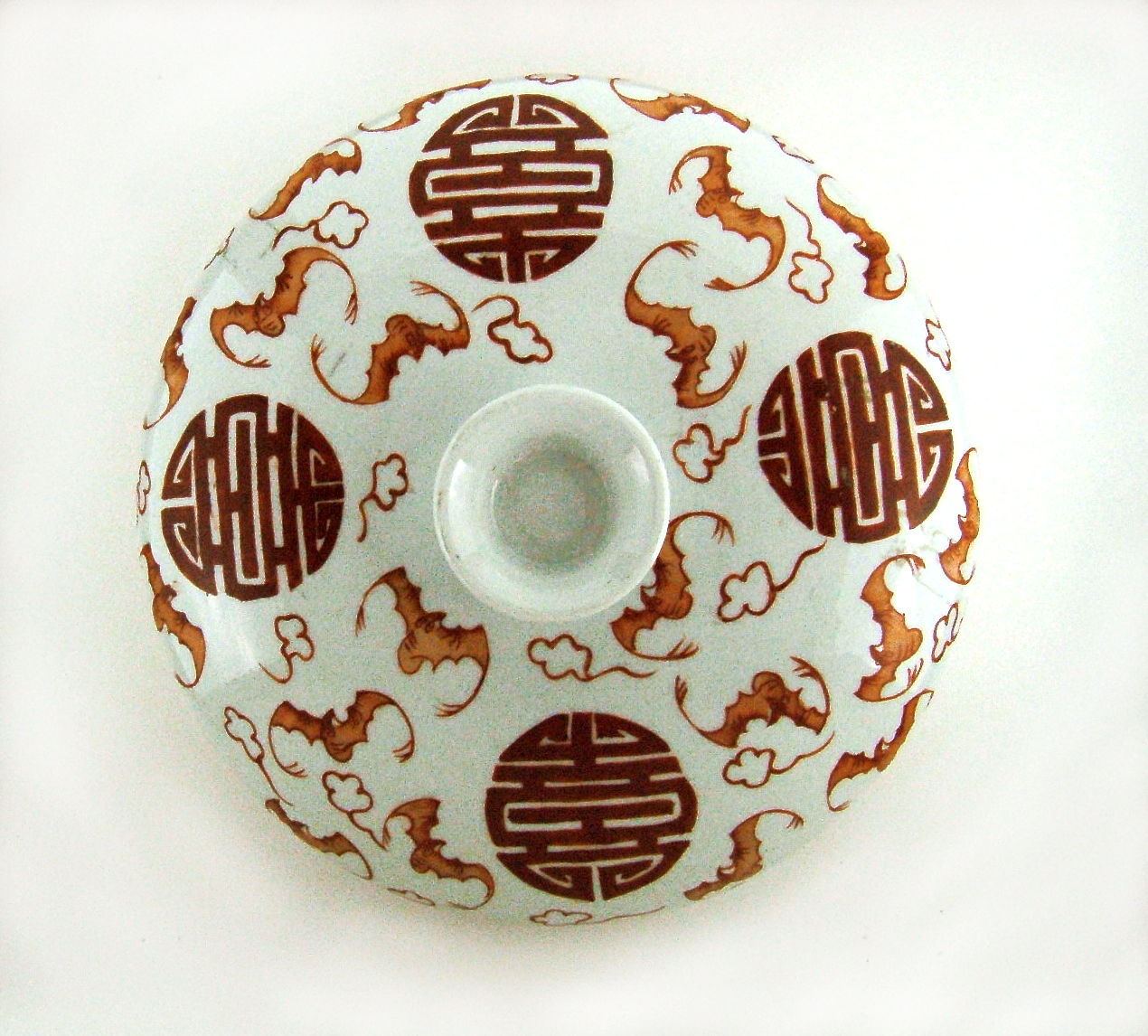
Ceramic with symbol and red bats

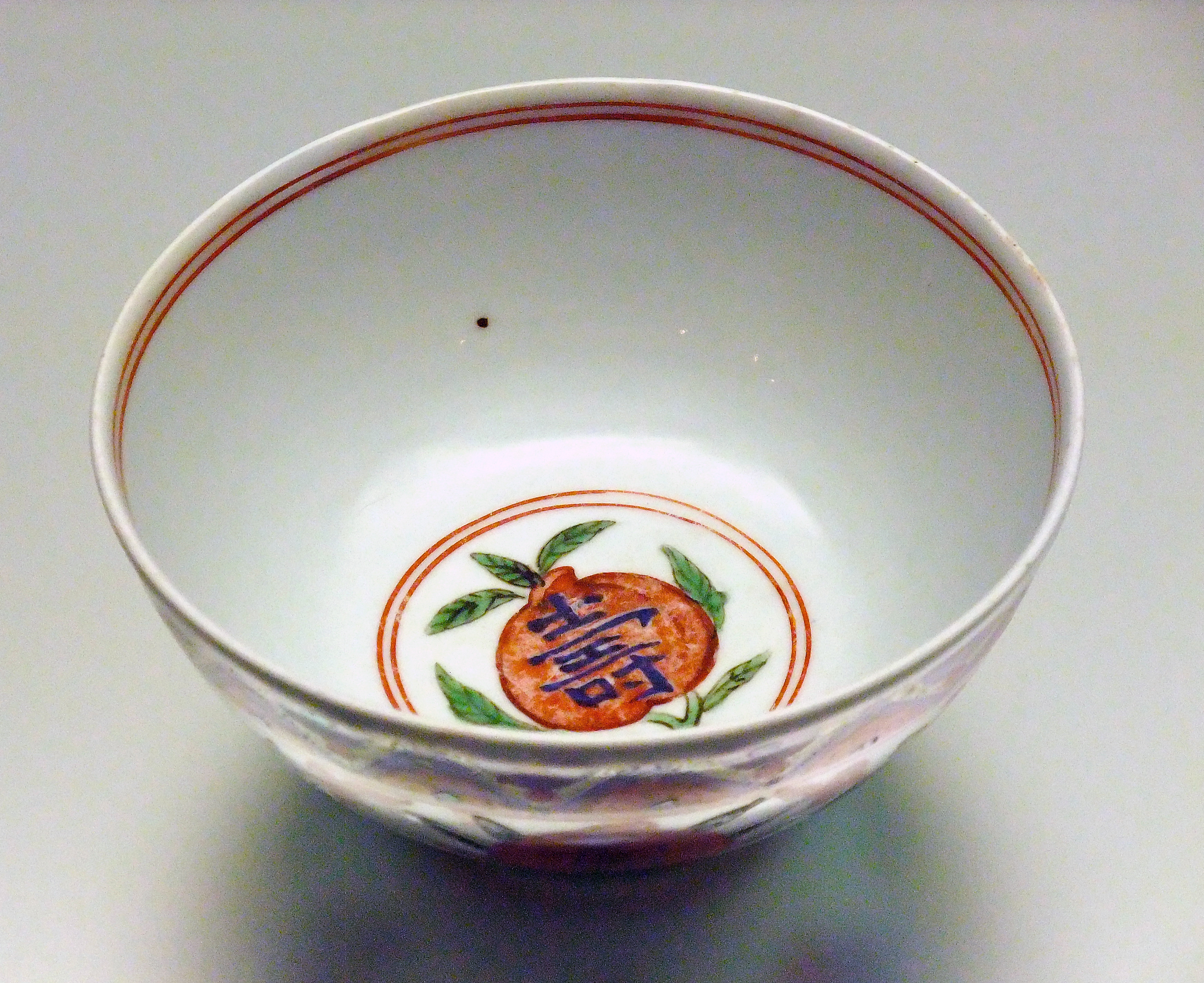
Cup with symbol within peach

== See also ==
- Fu character (福) for prosperity
- Double Happiness (囍), a common calligraphic good-luck design
- Fu Lu Shou, deities in Chinese folk religion
