= Sun Long (painter) =

Chinese landscape painter

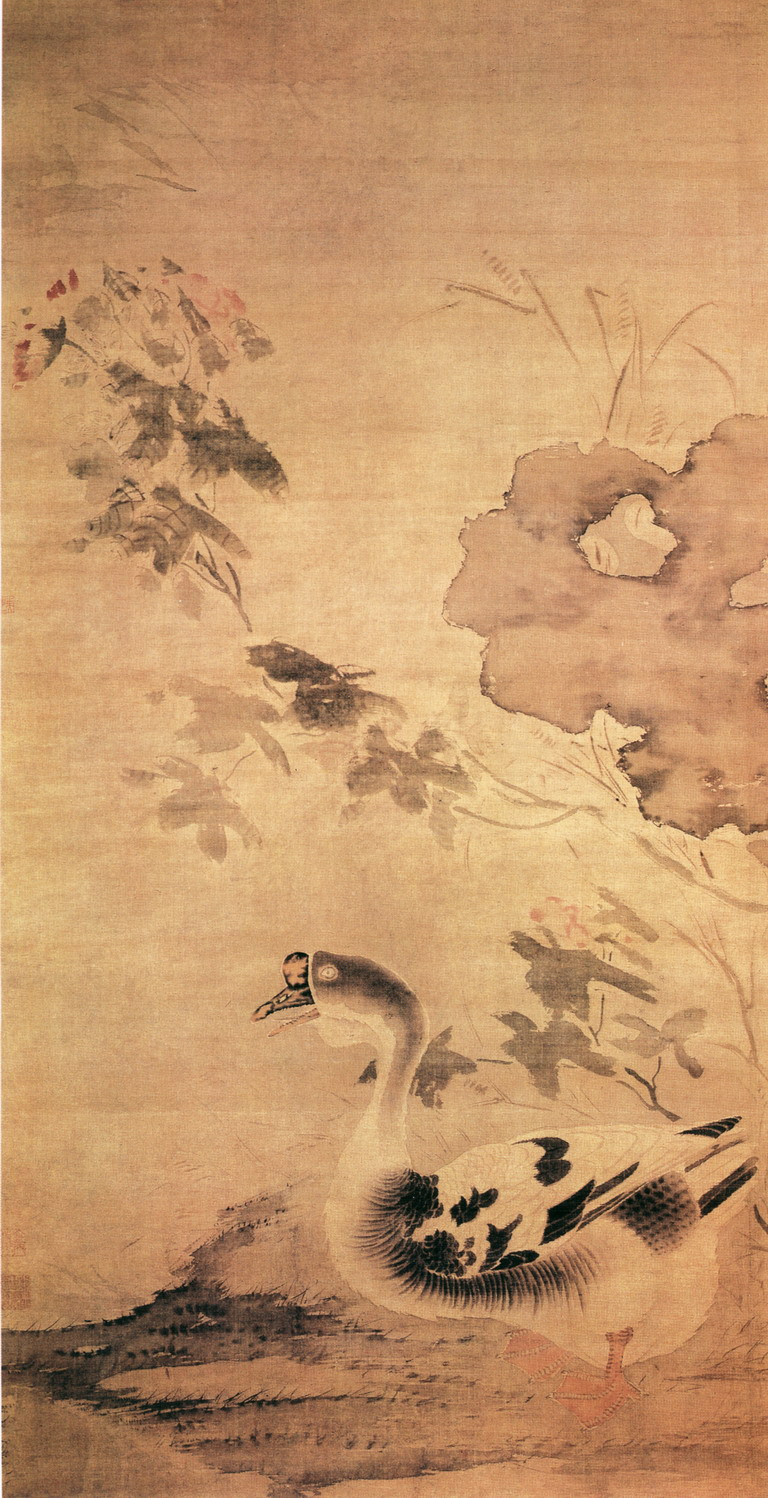
Swimming Goose by Flowers and Rocks (芙蓉游鹅图) Hanging scroll. Ink and color on silk. Width 84.2 cm, Height 159.3 cm. Palace Museum, Beijing.

Sun Long (simplified Chinese: 孙隆; traditional Chinese: 孫隆; pinyin: Sūn Lóng; Wade–Giles: Sun Lung; was a Chinese landscape painter that was active during the early Ming dynasty (1368–1644). His specific dates of birth and death have not been official or known, though he was active during the Xuande era.

Sun was born in Piling (毗陵 modern day Changzhou in the Jiangsu province). His style names were 'Tingzhen' (廷振) and 'Congji' (從吉). His pseudonym was 'Douchi' (都痴). Sun painted landscapes, but he was also a well known person for his plum, locust, and grass paintings.
