= Jang-ot =

Historical Korean headdress

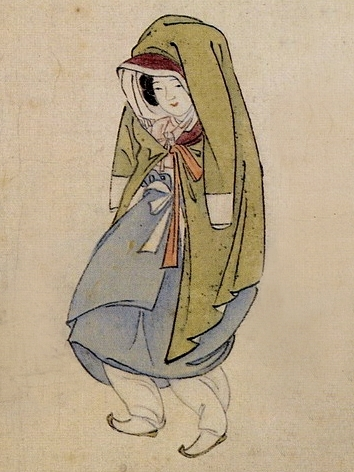
Jang-ot

A jang-ot (Korean: 장옷; Hanja: 長衣; lit. 'long gown'), also known as janot, jang-eui, or jang-ui (장의; 長衣), is a type of po worn by women of the Joseon Dynasty period as a headdress or veil to cover their faces by the mid-18th century. They were mostly worn by commoners but not exclusively. Jang-ot was originally a form of men's po called jang-ui, which was worn in 15th century. The jang-ui started to be worn by women as an overcoat in early Joseon, even becoming a popular fashion item for women of high status. It was previously one of the most representative women's overcoats; it was worn as a women's overcoat when they would leave their house until the 17th century.

According to the principles of the Joseon Dynasty's Confucianism, women were ordered not to show their face to foreign men, so they would cover their faces in many ways while going out. The jang-ot became a headdress by the mid 18th century to conceal face and upper bodies when walking in public under this influence. Besides the jang-ot, women also used two other forms of headdress to cover their faces depending on their social standing; sseugaechima (which was worn first worn by the upper-class women in the mid-Joseon and later used by all classes until the very late Joseon period) and the neoul.

== Origins ==
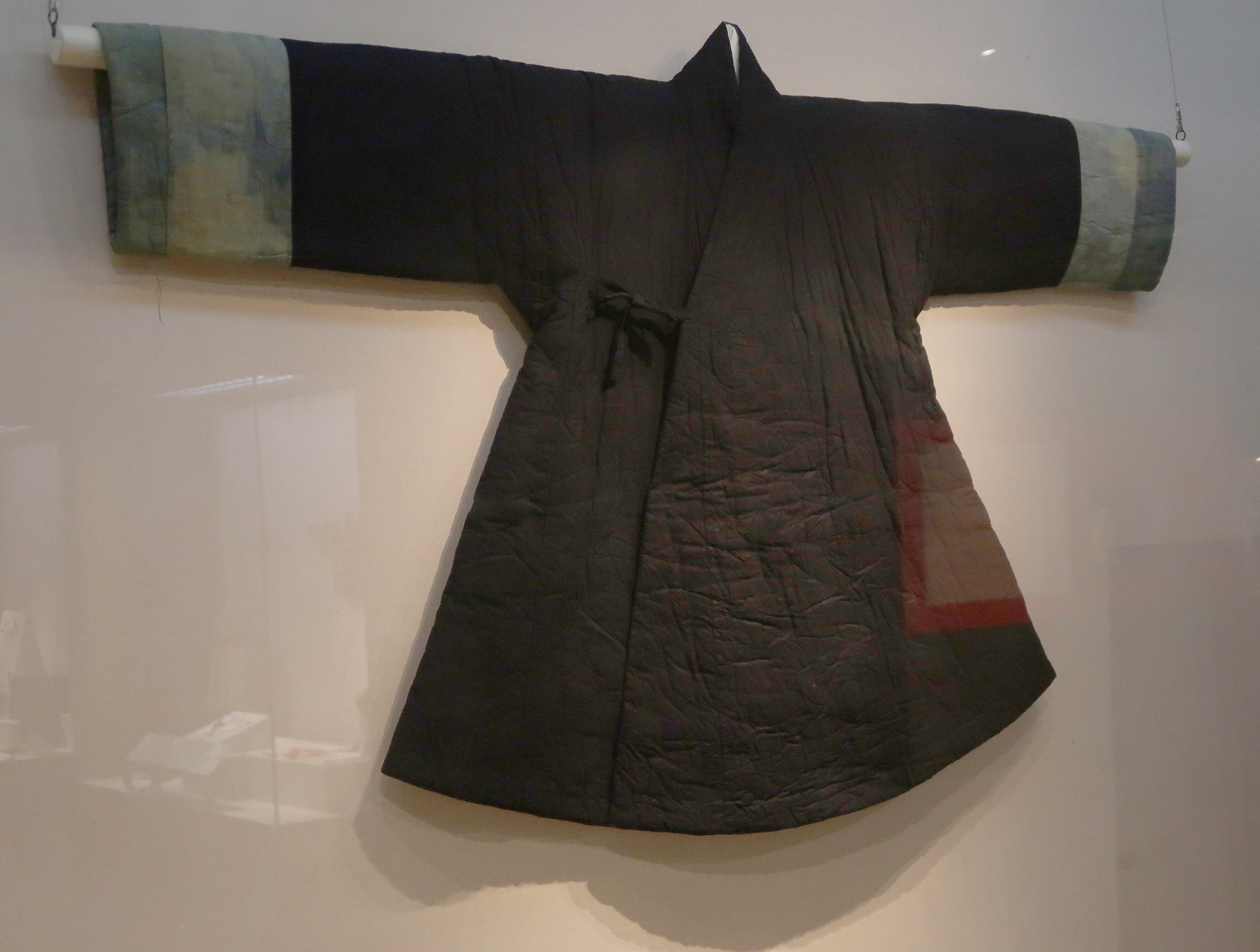
Jang-ot, a women's coat in 17th AD.

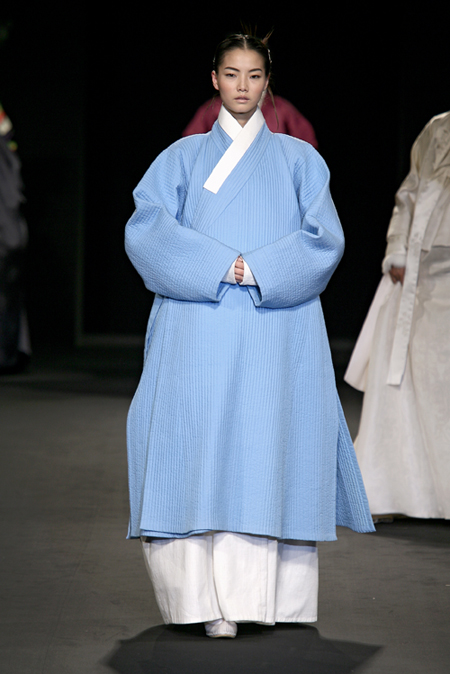
Women used to wear jangot as a coat.

Jang-ot was originally a form of men's po called jang-ui, which was worn in 15th century. The jang-ui (장의/長衣) originated from the Chinese jangui and shared the same role and name; it was then localized through the combination of the Chinese jangui and the Korean jangyu (長襦), a form of coat worn during the Three Kingdoms period, gaining its own characteristics.

=== Theories ===
The Jang-ot is known as women's clothing; however, there is a theory that says it was also worn by men. In the early years of the Joseon period, similar long coats that belonged to men and women in 16th century tombs. According to this, men started wearing jang-ot in the early years of the Joseon period to as an outerwear to add an extra layer to their clothing. Soon, women started to wear and use them as well, and jang-ot grew in popularity among them until it was worn exclusively by women by the late Joseon.

The other theory states that jang-ot was women's clothing from the beginning because of several unique characteristics that are only seen on women's headwear. Firstly, the front part is wider and longer than the men's po, so that a big skirt can fit under it. Secondly, the white cuffs at the end of the sleeves were rolled up; usually, on men's coats, the sleeves weren't rolled up, and the cuffs weren't white. Thirdly, there is no record on paintings of such men's clothing, and in the case of the 16th century graves, jang-ot was worn as shroud only by deceased women, not men.

== Characteristics ==
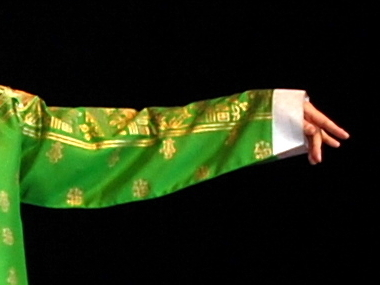
Geodeulji on a sleeve

The jang-ot is similar to durumagi, or the outer jacket of a hanbok. The difference is a jang-ot has a collar (git) and a ribbon for tying (goreum).

Jang-ot looks like a long coat with its two sleeves and collars. It has both outer and inner collars, the outer one is colorful while the inner one is white. They are both wide and straight, and called mokpangit (목판깃) and have an overall square shape. From the collars comes to both sides two or more ribbon, mainly red or purple, by which the headwear can be grabbed. The sleeves have the same width from shoulder to wrist, and has a white cuffs, called geodeulji (거들지 巨等乙只) at the end of them, which is worn rolled up. One of the main characteristic of the jang-ot is the mu (무) a different colored trapezoid shape fabric under on the armpit area. The purpose of the mu was to make the movements easier, even for using them as a headpiece. They did not change the process of the making, and kept this element until late Joseon. The front and back panel were long and they were made so that the width expanding till the lower part. It was quite a big clothing during the 16th century, but from the mid-17th century the headwear become shorter and narrower thus more stylish.

=== Colors and materials ===
Mainly they used colors for the headwear like pink, purple, green, indigo, jade green and black. The fabric varied from season to season, they used raw silk, sheer silk and ramie cloth. Though, by the late Joseon they mostly made them with cotton or silk, with a red dye in the lining and green for the gown.

== Way of wearing ==
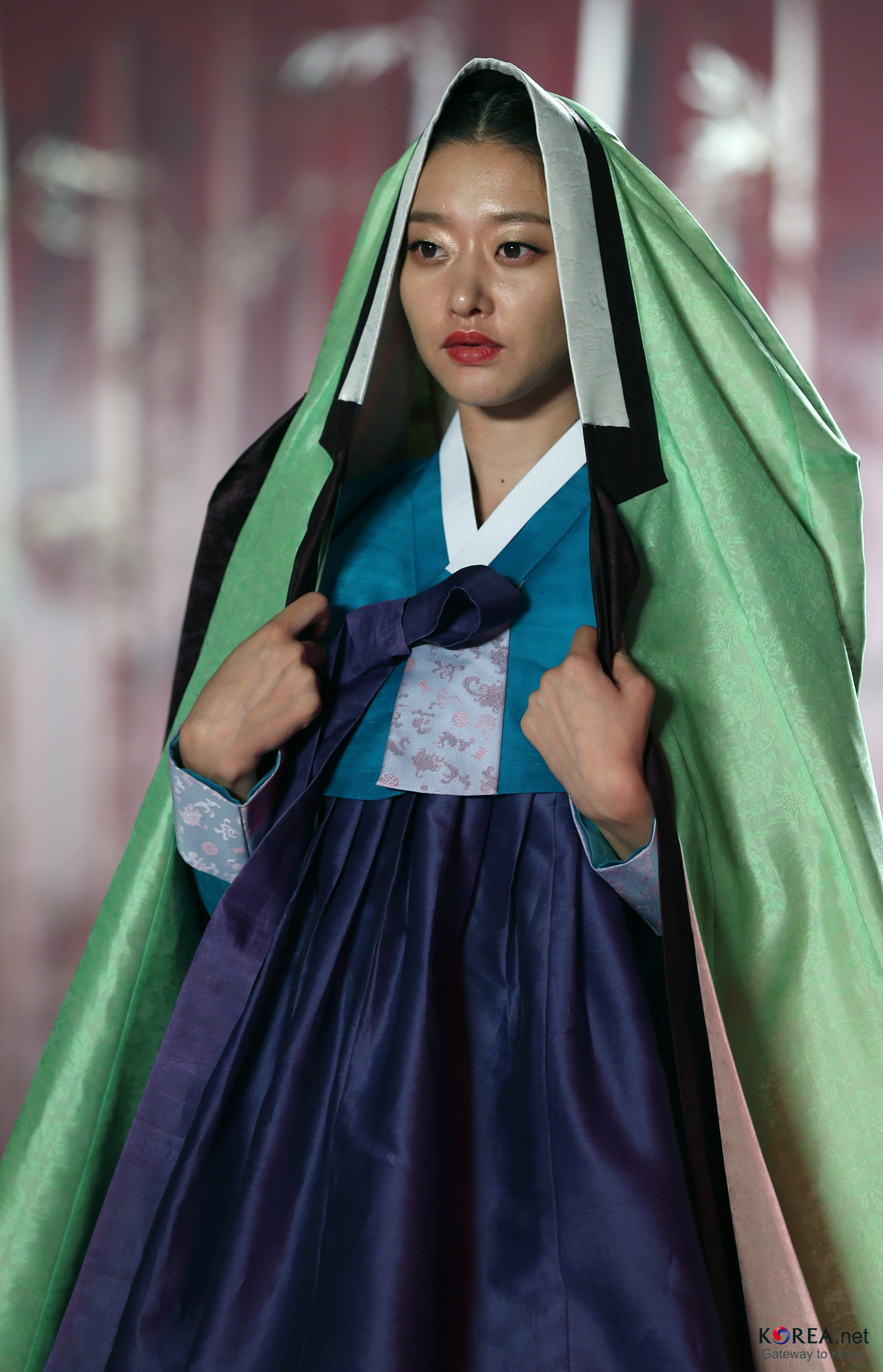
Jang-ot worn on head

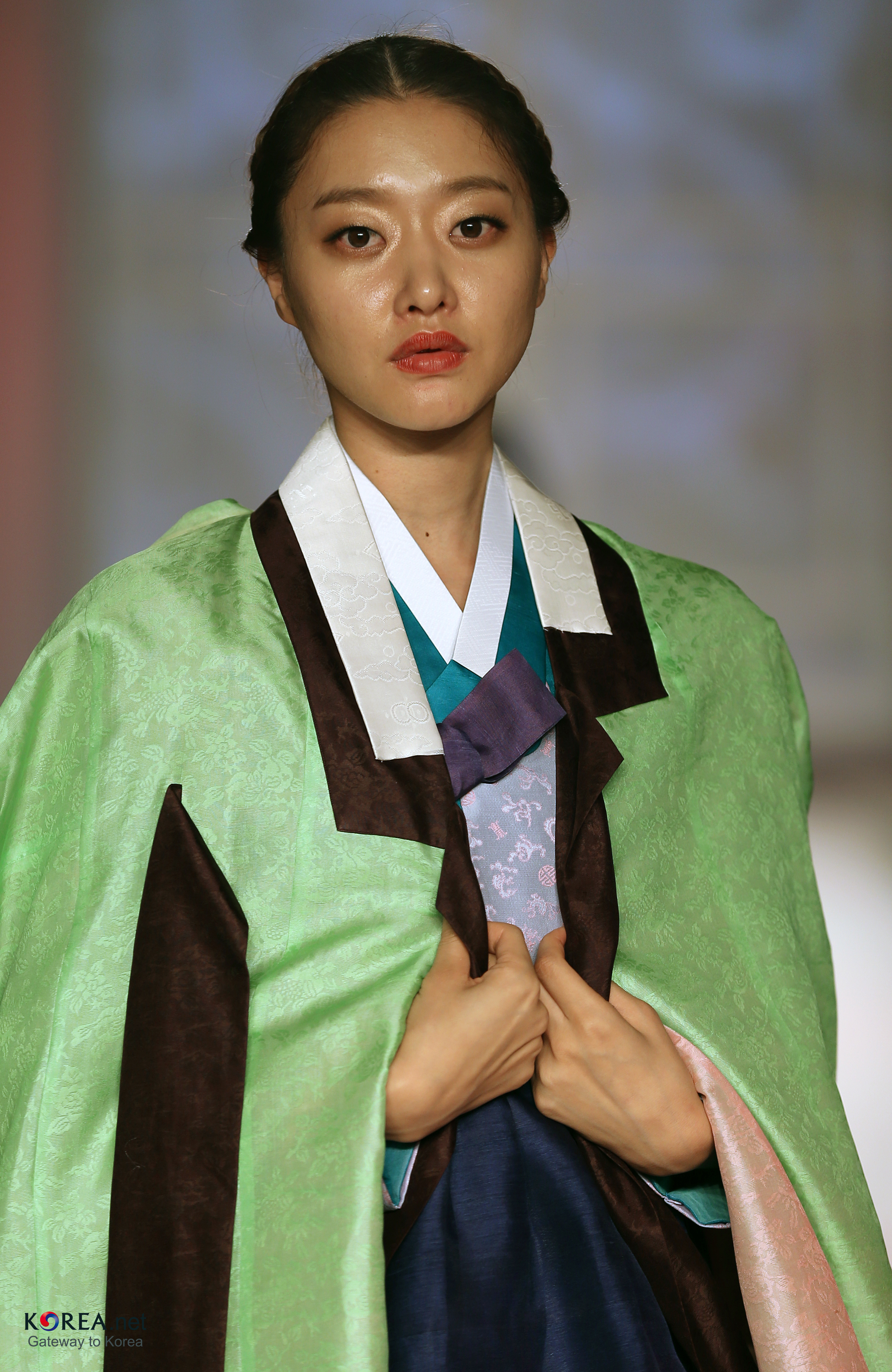
Jang-ot worn on shoulders

Before the 18th century, the headwear was worn directly on the body like durumagi, but since then it was worn either on the body or on the head. Jang-ot is the typical women's clothing for covering the face when going out and the most widely worn headgear as well. It has seasonal variations made from different materials, such as simple-layered made from ramie in the summer and double-layered quilted clothing made with cotton for the winter. Depending on the region or household it was also used as a bridal clothing or a suui (수의 襚衣), a veil worn by the deceased person.

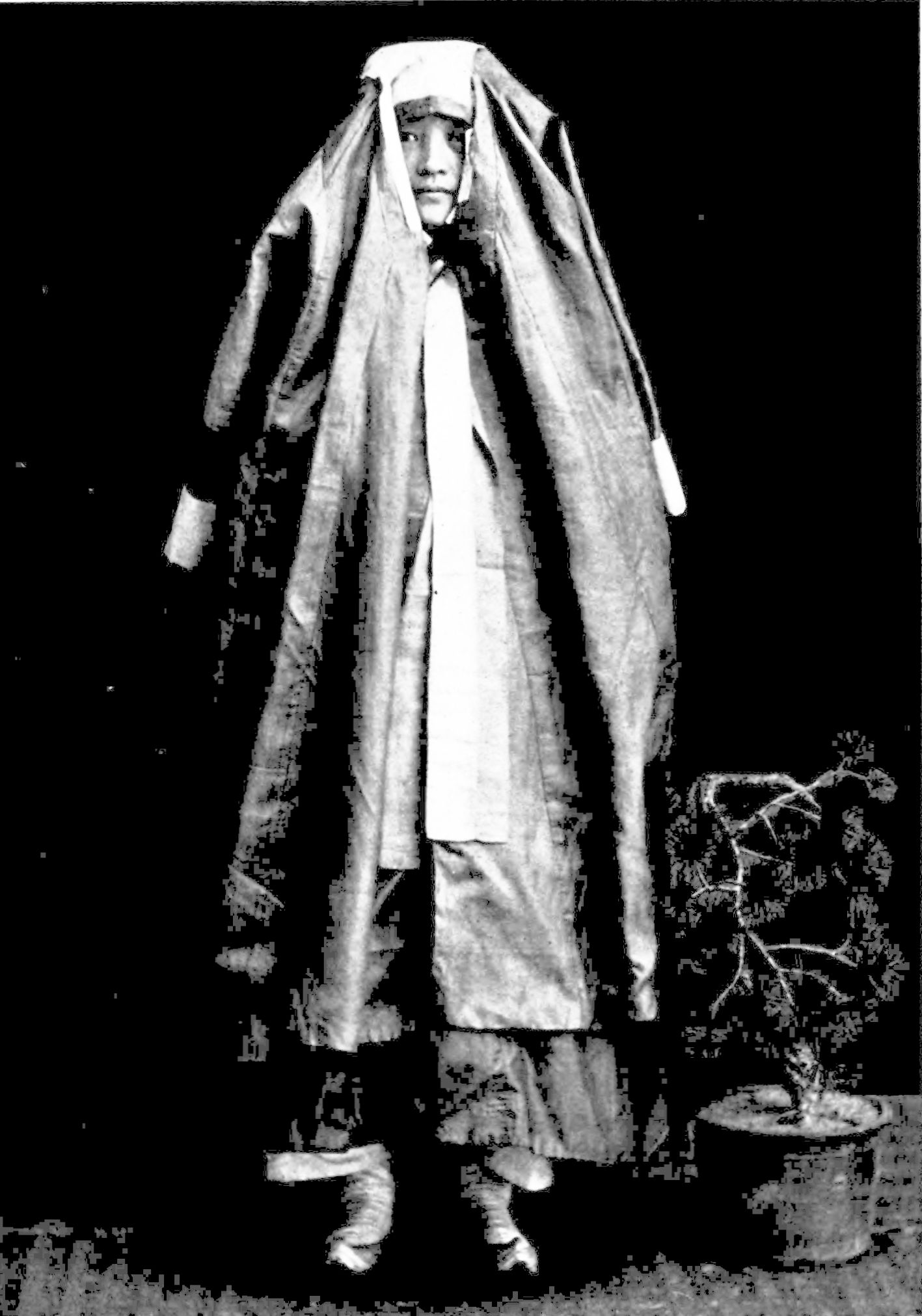
Woman's correct street costume

The jang-ot should be placed on the head, only revealing the face. By the collars of the coat, the ribbons under the chin or buttons should be used to tighten them up. When working or in the case of elderly they folded the headpiece and carried them on their head or shoulders.

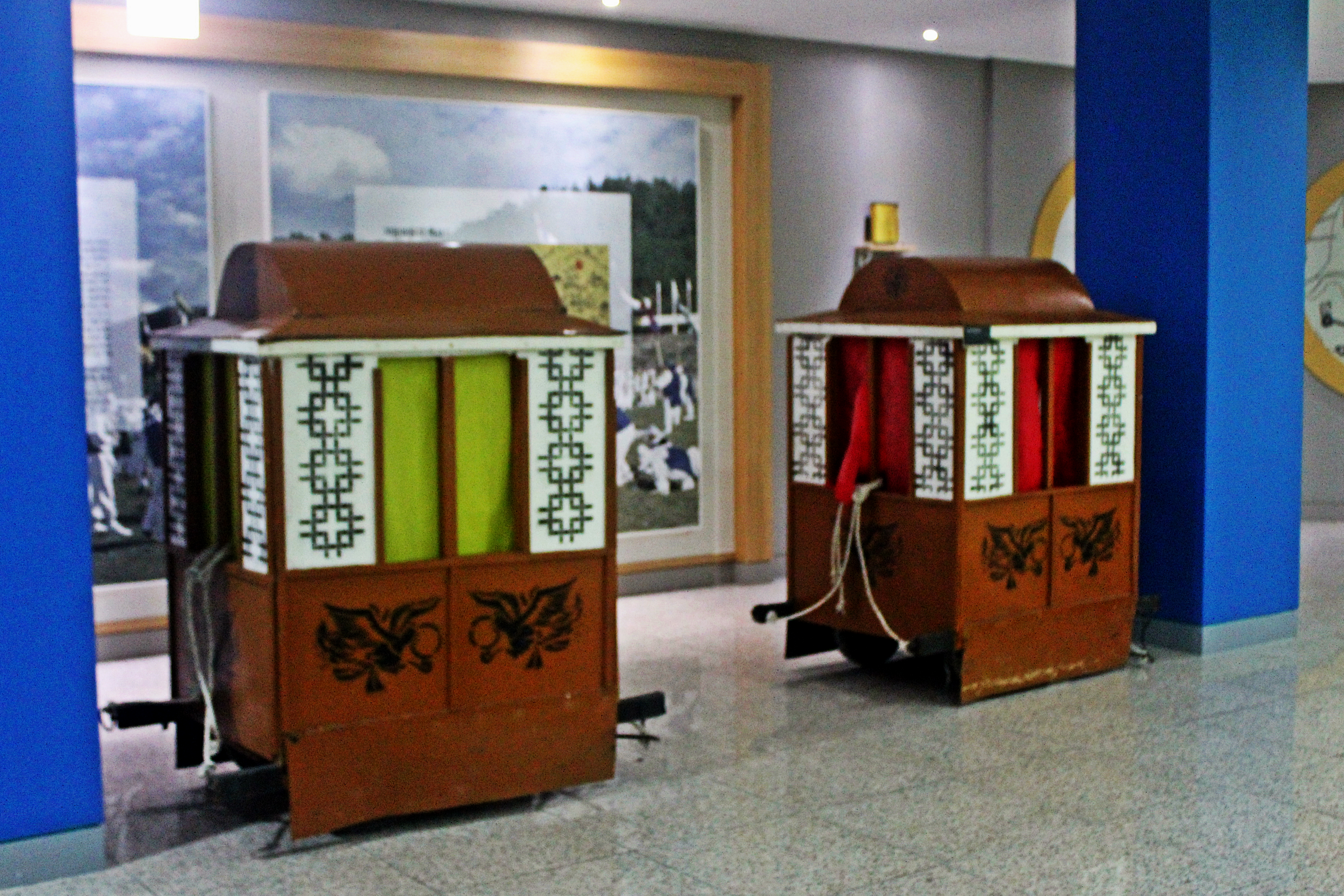
Gama, a small carriage in which women were transported

== Significance ==
Confucianism grew and became more and more influential in the Korean peninsula, and by the time of the Joseon Dynasty it became the dynasty's main ideology. The Confucian ethical ideology disciplined the social system of that period. One of its main principle was that men and women cannot meet after they turned seven. Women could only show their faces to their family and wore different face coverings as a result. These headpieces also differentiated women by their rank: neoul was worn by women in the court; sseugaechima was worn by the yangban class; and jang-ot was used mostly by the jungin and commoners. This division was not strictly regulated; by the late Joseon, both the upper and middle class wore jang-ot without any classification.

The popularization of the jang-ot over other headpieces was thanks to the changing of the commuting device. During the early Joseon, women mostly rode horses while wearing neoul on their head and jang-ot as a coat. However, when using gama (가마 有屋轎) – a smaller carriage – as a way of transportation, it was more comfortable to wear only jang-ot, since it was difficult to enter the carriage with the neoul on.

== See also ==
- Baji (clothing)
- Chador - similar clothing from Persia
- Dangui
- Hwarot
- Hijab and Paranja– similar concept but in Islamic religion
- Wonsam
