= Geodeulji =

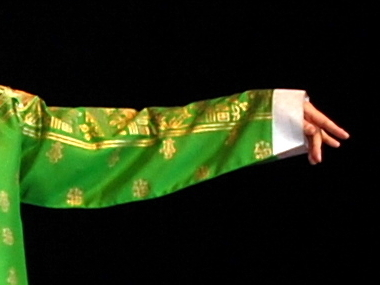
- Geodeulji on the sleeve of a dangui

Korean name
- Hangul: 거들지
- Revised Romanization: geodeulji
- McCune–Reischauer: kŏdŭlchi

Geodeulji is a small piece of white cloth to attach to the edge of sleeves of hanbok, traditional Korean attire. Its inner is back up by changhoji (창호지), a type of Korean paper and its width is about 6 ~ 8 cm. Geodeulji is attached to dangui (a ceremonial jacket) or jangot (장옷, a headgear) to cover hands because showing hands in front of seniors was considered not a courtesy during the Korean Joseon Dynasty.

Although geodeulji was originally only allowed for yangban women (nobility) to use, since about 1900, it began to be used by commoners who could not have a ceremonial clothing like hwarot or wonsam. They put it on their outer jeogori (a short jacket) for their wedding ceremony to represent the robe as a formal attire. Geudeulji is inwardly sewn at the edge of the sleeves and then is turned outwardly. Even though geodeulji was originally used to cover hands, it prevents the edge of the sleeves from getting dirty, so wearers used to change only geodeulji. In addition, hansam (한삼), fabric extension attached to the sleeves of wonsam or hwarot is sometimes called geudeulji as well, because the two are similar in usage. However, hansam can cover thoroughly hands unlike geudeulji.

== See also ==
- Cuff
- Hemline
- Hanbok
