= Sseugaechima =

Headwear that noble Korean women used

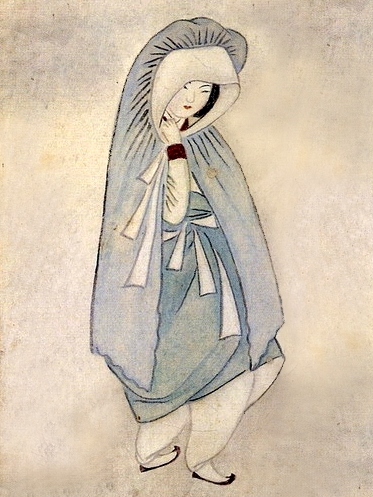
A woman wearing a sseugaechima (painting: Lovers under the moon (월하정인; 月下情人) by Shin Yun-bok after 1805)

The sseugaechima (Korean: 쓰개치마; lit. headpiece skirt) is a kind of headwear that noble Korean women used during the middle and end of the Joseon dynasty (1392–1897) to cover their faces. As Confucian ideals became stronger, women were required to hide their faces from men when leaving the house. There were several kinds of headdresses that the Joseon women used according to their ranks: the neoul was used by the court women, the sseugaechima was used by the yangban women; and the jang-ot was used by the jungin women or commoners. The sseugaechima was a piece of clothing in the shape of a skirt and was mainly made from cotton or silk.

== History ==
=== Early ===
It is estimated that since the period of Later Silla (Unified Silla, 668–935), Korean women wore some kind of face covering. However, it is only confirmed by literature from the period of the Goryeo Dynasty (918–1392) that these coverings were used. They were called mongsu (Korean: 몽수; Hanja: 蒙首) at the time and were passed down from the Sui and Tang dynasties; they were mostly worn by noble women as luxury items.

=== Joseon Dynasty ===
During the Joseon Dynasty, Confucian ideals, such as the division of the classes and sexes, became more influential and had an impact on everyday life. The rule stating that men and women could not see each other's faces if they did not know one another became stricter; for women, leaving the house was strictly restricted or even banned. Therefore, in order not to see each other, different types of face-covering headpieces for women were developed including the jang-ot, sseugaechima, and neoul.

There is no information about exactly when as well as which class started wearing the sseugaechima, but it is estimated that it was from at least February 1526. At that time the wardrobe of the women from yangban families became an issue. The process to make and wear the sseugaechima was easier than that of the neoul, a face covering worn by upper-class women. The sseugaechima was worn mainly by the women of yangban families and was regarded more highly than the jang-ot. However, by the late Joseon Dynasty, the division between the classes became weaker and upper-class women started wearing both. The sseugaechima became more common among women of every class. However, it started to disappear due to reforms in the enlightenment era and the entry of women into society. Some high-ranking wives who entered society had already begun to remove their face coverings and acted more freely.

=== Reform ===
At the center of the head-covering reform were the girls who started attending modern schools. However, it was very difficult for them to take off the veils due to the prevalent way of thinking at the time. Dropouts increased because of parents' opposition to girls removing their face coverings. Some girls used black umbrellas to cover their faces and avoid leaving school. From the beginning of the 20th century, face covering slowly become less common and started to disappear. In 1908, the sseugaechima disappeared from Ewha University and Yeondong University, and in 1911, it was banned from Baehwa University and replaced by umbrellas. But it took a longer time for sseugaechima to disappear completely. Until the 1940s it was not commonly accepted to use umbrellas instead of face coverings, so the sseugaechima continued to live on, especially in the rural areas where families pretended to be yangbans, so newlywed brides had to wear face coverings when going out.

== Appearance ==
The sseugaechima's appearance is like that of a traditional Korean skirt; it essentially has a waistline and a wide skirt part. Though it is similar to a skirt, its length is shorter by around 30, and its width is narrower as well. The waist of the skirt is narrower by around 10 and is made mainly in white, jade, or red color. The skirt has a trapezoid shape, so it hangs longer in the front and shorter at the back. The skirts were mainly made from silk or calico cotton.

== Way of wearing ==
Women put the sseugaechimas on their heads so that the waistline aligned with their faces and the skirt part covered their hair. The waistline outlined and covered the face up to the forehead. Women grabbed it by the ends of both sides of the waistline under their chin so that the headpiece would not slide down their heads. It was wide enough to cover the head, but because of the volume of the hair and the skirt's inner wrinkles, it could look bulgier as well. However, it was still long enough to cover the back. The headpiece was usually hung in the room so it would be easier to grab and put on when leaving the house. The type differed from season to season; in colder months the sseugaechima was worn in layers or lined with cotton. In the summer, women would use one made from silk. Despite the temperature, women always had to wear one when leaving the house.

== Significance ==
The sseugaechima represented the ranks of the women in Joseon society compared to other women and to men as well. In the late Joseon Dynasty, society changed to a more male-oriented one, lowering the ranks of women to strengthen the Confucian ethical ideology. It was necessary to correct the discipline of the social system of that period. By making only the women wear different face coverings, society reinforced a male-dominated concept and reflected a relationship similar to that of a master and servant. The type of headpiece was also used to show the rank of the wearer: the neoul was worn by women in the court, the sseugaechima was worn by the yangban class' women; and the jang-ot was used by jungin women and commoners. Compared to the neoul and jang-ot, the sseugaechima was easier to make and wear, and as the social rank division started to blur with time, it became more widely used. However, it gradually got shorter and eventually disappeared.

== See also ==
- List of Korean clothing
