= Daeryeong Suksu =

Joseon court chef

Daeryeong Suksu (Korean: 대령숙수; Hanja: 待令熟手) refers to the male chef working for royal family during Joseon dynasty. The two words of the terminology means a chef (숙수 (熟手)) waiting for king's command (대령 (待令)).

Under the title, they belonged to Saongwon, of the administrative organ, Ijo (이조; 吏曹) with several other chefs in hierarchical structure. The chief of the staff took the seat of cham-ui in 3rd rank of Jeong (정3품), following several titles of each cook like Jaebu, Seonbu, Jobu, Imbu and Paengbu, which means each chef was entitled to posts in governmental services, to take charge of cookery for royal cuisine.

For their class, they belong to Chungin, the mid-level people by linking their secretive arts of cookery for generations to get into the palace, especially during royal parties like Jinjyeon (진연,進宴). For king's meal (sura, 수라), Suksu worked in sojubang while specially organized facilities for cooking established during parties or special cases.

After the collapse of the dynastic power, the Suksu An Soon Hwan for Emperor Gojong of the Korean Empire set up the royal cuisine restaurant Myeongwol gwan (meaning place for brilliant moon) to inform the public of royal cookeries.
