= Dangui =

Traditional Korean upper garment for women

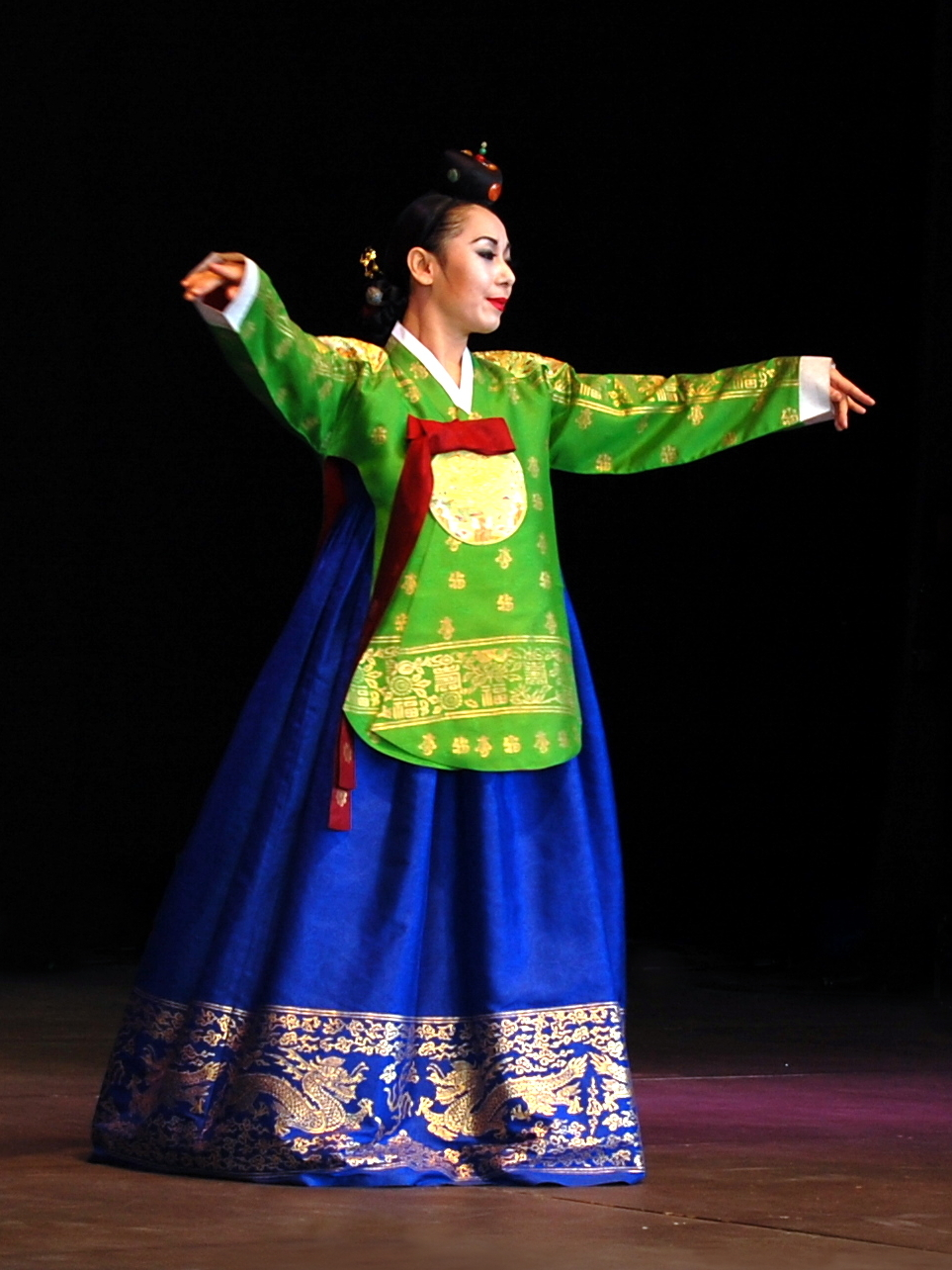
- A model in a green dangui and seuran chima, a decorative wrapping skirt with geumbak (gold leaf) patterns.

Korean name
- Hangul: 당의
- Hanja: 唐衣
- RR: dangui
- MR: tangŭi

Dangui (Korean: 당의; Hanja: 唐衣; lit. Tang clothing; also written with the Hanja characters《唐衣服》; Korean pronunciation: [tɐŋɰi]), also called dang-jeogori (당저고리; 唐저고리; lit. Tang jeogori), dang-jeoksam (당적삼; 唐的衫; lit. Tang's robe), dang-hansam (당한삼; 唐汗衫; lit. Tang sweat robe), danggoui (당고의; 唐고의), and samja (삼자; 衫子; lit. shirt), is a type of jeogori (upper garment) for women in hanbok, the Korean traditional clothing, which was worn for ceremonial occasions (e.g. for minor ceremonies in the palace as soryebok (小禮服)) in the palace during the Joseon period. It was typically a garment item reserved for the upper class and commoners of this period would rarely see anyone in this garment. It was worn as a simple official outfit or for small national ceremonies while court ladies wore it as a daily garment.

== Origins ==
It is currently believed the dangui originated from jangjeogori (장저고리; long jeogori), which was worn before the early Joseon as formal wear.

The scholars of the late Joseon period, such as Pak Kyusu, who wrote the 1841 Geoga japbokgo (거가잡복고 居家雜服攷), a history of Korean clothing, believed that the dangui originated from China and may have dated back to the time when the Chinese clothing system was introduced to Korea between 57 BC and 668 AD, during the Three Kingdoms period of Korea:

지금 사람들은 모두 당의가 부인의 예복이라고 이른다. 그 제도 또한 녹색이고 좁은 소매에 옆을 트며 길이는 배를 가릴 정도인데 또한 어디서부터 기원하였는지 알 수 없고 이것은 예에 근거가 없다【생각건데, 원삼과 당의의 제도는 모두 근본이 없어 이른바 당의라는 것은 당나라 때의 부인의 편복이었는데 우리나라 풍속이 우연히 그것을 본떠 마침내 당의라고 이름하게 된 것이다.】 (“其一, 今人皆謂唐衣是婦人禮服, 其制亦綠色爲之窄袖缺骻, 長可掩服. 亦未知起自何, 是於禮無據【按圓衫唐衣之制, 俱無原委, 所謂唐衣者, 似是唐時婦人便服, 而東俗偶然放之, 遂名唐衣也.】”)

— Bak Gyusu, Geoga japbokgo (거가잡복고 居家雜服攷), 1841, 『居家雜服考』, 「內服」

This belief was due to the use of the Chinese character《唐》; this character could either refer to the Tang (唐) dynasty or indicate a "Chinese" (唐) product introduced from China; but, in this context, the scholars had assumed that it referred to the Tang dynasty. However, the claim that the dangui dates back to the Tang dynasty is currently judged as being erroneous, considering that the clothing characteristics of the dangui appeared in the middle of the 17th century according to the excavation of related relics. It is also noted that it is only in the 17th century that the term dangui first appeared in literature.

Whether the late Joseon theory on the origins of the dangui is probable or not, it is certain that the dangui was worn during the Joseon period, based on historical documents and remains. The scholar, Yi Jae (李縡 1680 – 1746) mentioned the dangui in his book, Sarye p'yŏllam 《사례편람; 四禮便覽; Sarye p'yŏllam; lit. "Easy Manual of the Four Rites" or "Convenient Reference to the Four Rites"》which defines four important rites based on Confucianism. In the chapter, Gwallyejo《冠禮條》on the coming of age ceremonies, the samja (삼자; 衫子) was commonly called dangui and its length reaches to the knees and its sleeves are narrow. It is also a woman's sangbok (Hanja: 常服; Chinese: 常服; pinyin: chángfú), a daily garments when working.

== Construction and design ==
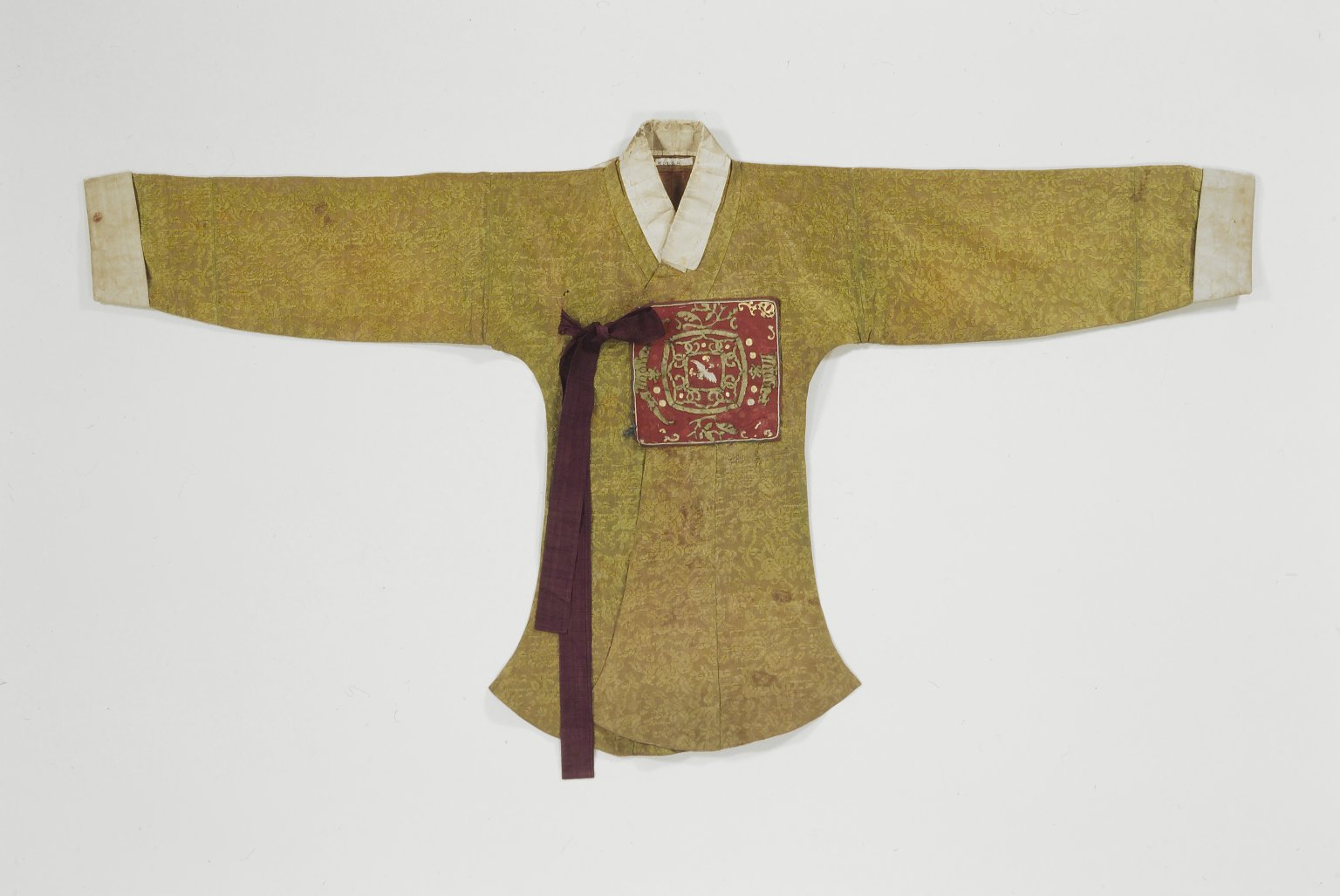
A dangui worn by a court woman, Joseon dynasty, 19th century, from the Brooklyn Museum

The form of dangui is similar to that of jeogori; however, the length of both the front and back side of the dangui reach to the knees-level and is triple to that of jeogori.

The characteristic design purpose of the dangui is to emphasize the beauty of the hanbok's curvy lines. The side seams are open to the armpit and are curved in shape. When making a dangui with a yellowish green fabric, the color for the inner fabric and for goreum (고름), which is the ribbons tied at the chest, is red and purple respectively. Two goreum are attached at the left side of git (깃), which is a fabric band of that trims the collar while one short goreum is at the git's right side.

The sleeves of dangui are narrow. At the end of the sleeves of dangui, there is geodeulji, a kind of white border band attached. The white border band is an indication that it is a type of ceremonial garment.

The materials, along with the decorations and colours used in the dangui, differed based on the social status of its wearer, on the occasions when it had to be worn, and on the seasons.

=== Lining and padding ===
In addition, the dangui can be divided into two types depending on its layer: the gyeop-dangui (겹당의), which is a double layered dangui, and the hot-dangui (홑당의), which is a single-layered dangui. The hot-dangui was also called dang-jeoksam (당적삼; 唐的衫) or dang-hansam (당한삼; 唐汗衫). The gyeop-dangui was usually worn during winter while the hot-dangui in summer.

As the Queen had worn a white dangui made of a single fabric the day before the Dano festival, which falls on the 5th day of the fifth month of the lunar calendar, every women at court followed the trend and change their clothing to the single layered one the next day. Likewise, when the Queen began to wear a double layered dangui the day before Chuseok, an event which celebrates on every 15th day of August in the lunar calendar, all women in the palace changed their clothing to the double layered dangui the next day.

=== Colours and decorations ===
==== Colours ====
The queen consort, the king's concubines, sanggung (court matron), and yangban women (nobility) wore the garment over a short jacket called jeogori. According to colour, there were yellowish green, pale green, purple, navy, dark blue, and white-colored dangui and others, but yellowish green coloured one was the most commonly worn dangui during the time. The dangui were also named after their colours, for example, yeondu dangui for green, jaju dangui for plum, namsong dangui for blue, and baesaek dangui for white. Each colour also has its own unique association with the seasons: purple were used for the winter solstice, pale green was for spring, and white was for the Dano, in the summer after the Dano, or were used as mourning attire for a state funeral. The purple dangui was used by the queen in winter. The dark blue dangui appears to have been used by low-ranking court ladies, who wore it on important events, such as royal wedding.

==== Decorations ====
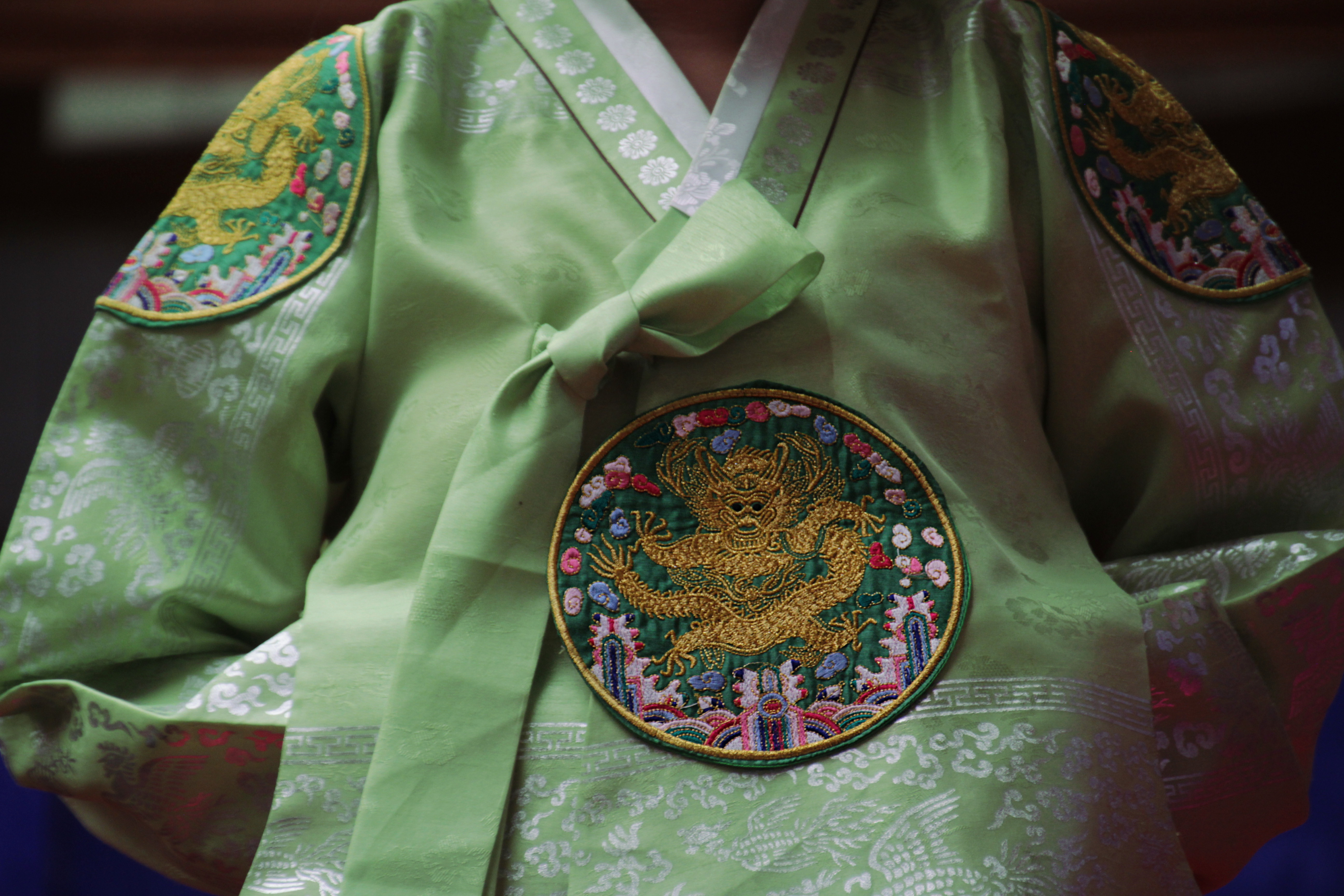
A dangui with a royal badge

The dangui for women at court strictly represented the wearer's rank, whereas the dangui for commoners was not allowed to have any style used for the former. The dangui for the Queen, princesses or other royalty, geumbak (gold leaf) patterns were decorated from the shoulder part through the end of the sleeves, as well as the front and back side, and goreum.

In the geumbak patterns, illustrations of flower or bats or Hanja characters which symbolizes auspicious themes, such as su《壽》which uses the Chinese character shou《壽》and expresses wishes for longevity; bok《福》which uses the Chinese character fu《福》which expresses wishes for good fortune; and hui《壽》which uses the Chinese character xi《囍》, commonly known as double happiness in English, which expresses wishes for a blessed marriage. For the Queen, patterns depicting the phoenix were also used. Official rank badge called hyungbae or the royal badge called bu could also be sewn on the chest area of the dangui according to its wearer ranks.

== Wedding dress ==
When the dangui was worn as a wedding dress, the bride wore it over a chima (a wrapping skirt) and jeogori. The wearer also put a hwagwan (a form of Korean guan) on the head, attached a norigae, a type of accessory to the goreum, and wore a pair of shoes made of silk. Since it was easy to wear and neat, the dangui eventually became one of commonly worn wedding clothing among commoners during the Joseon dynasty.

== Gallery ==
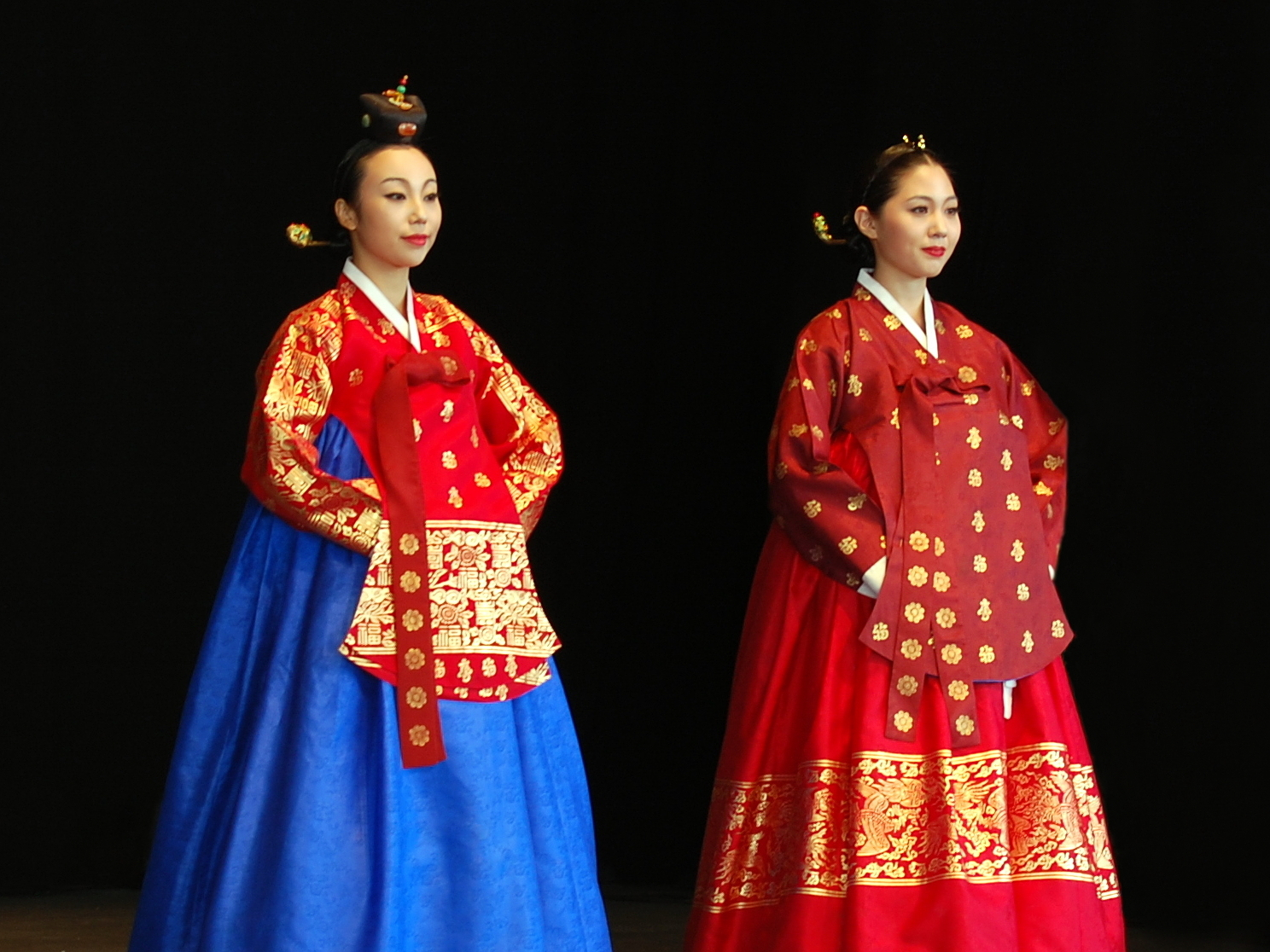
Models in red dangui

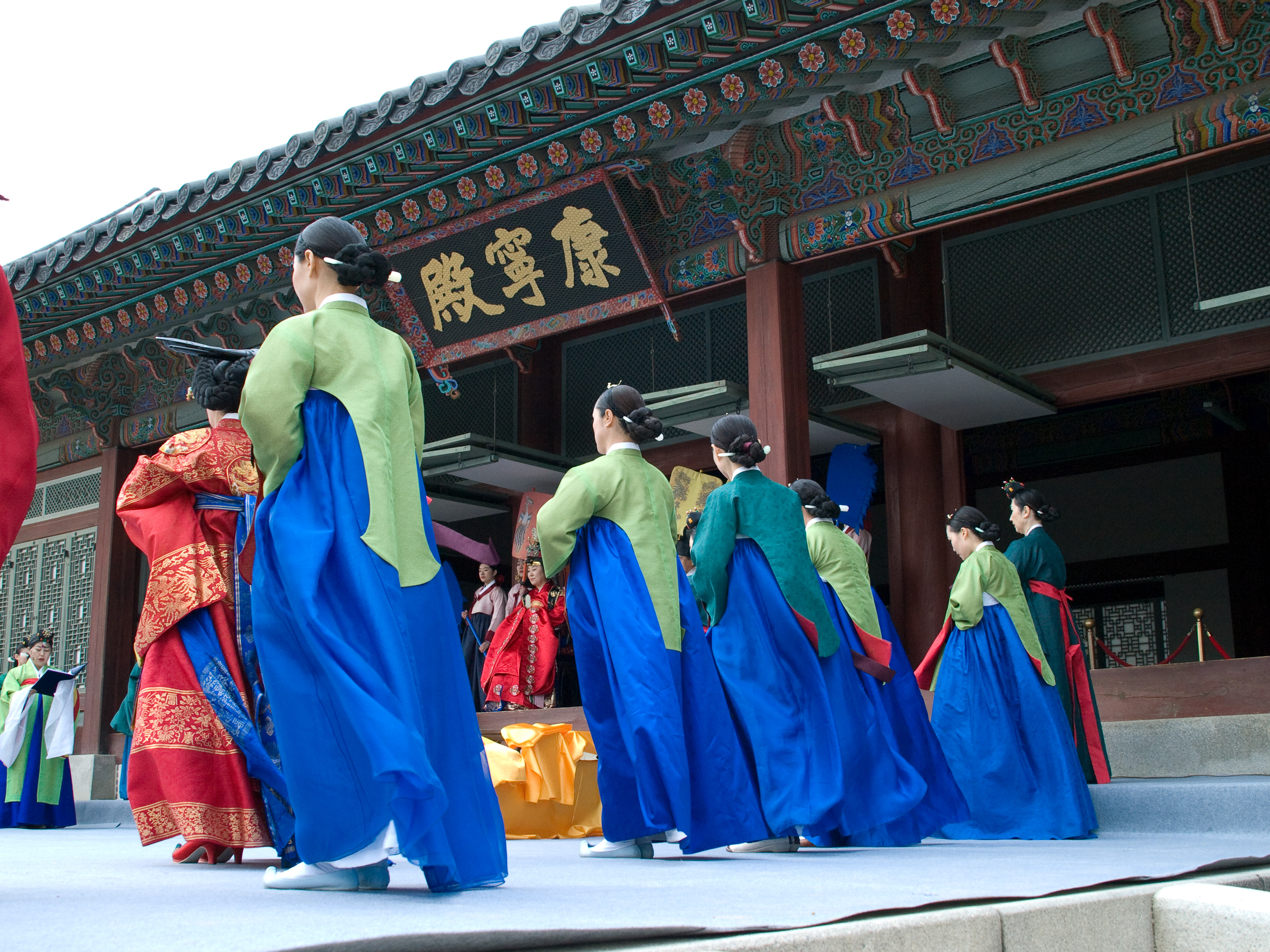
Models of kungnyŏ, lady-in-waiting in green dangui

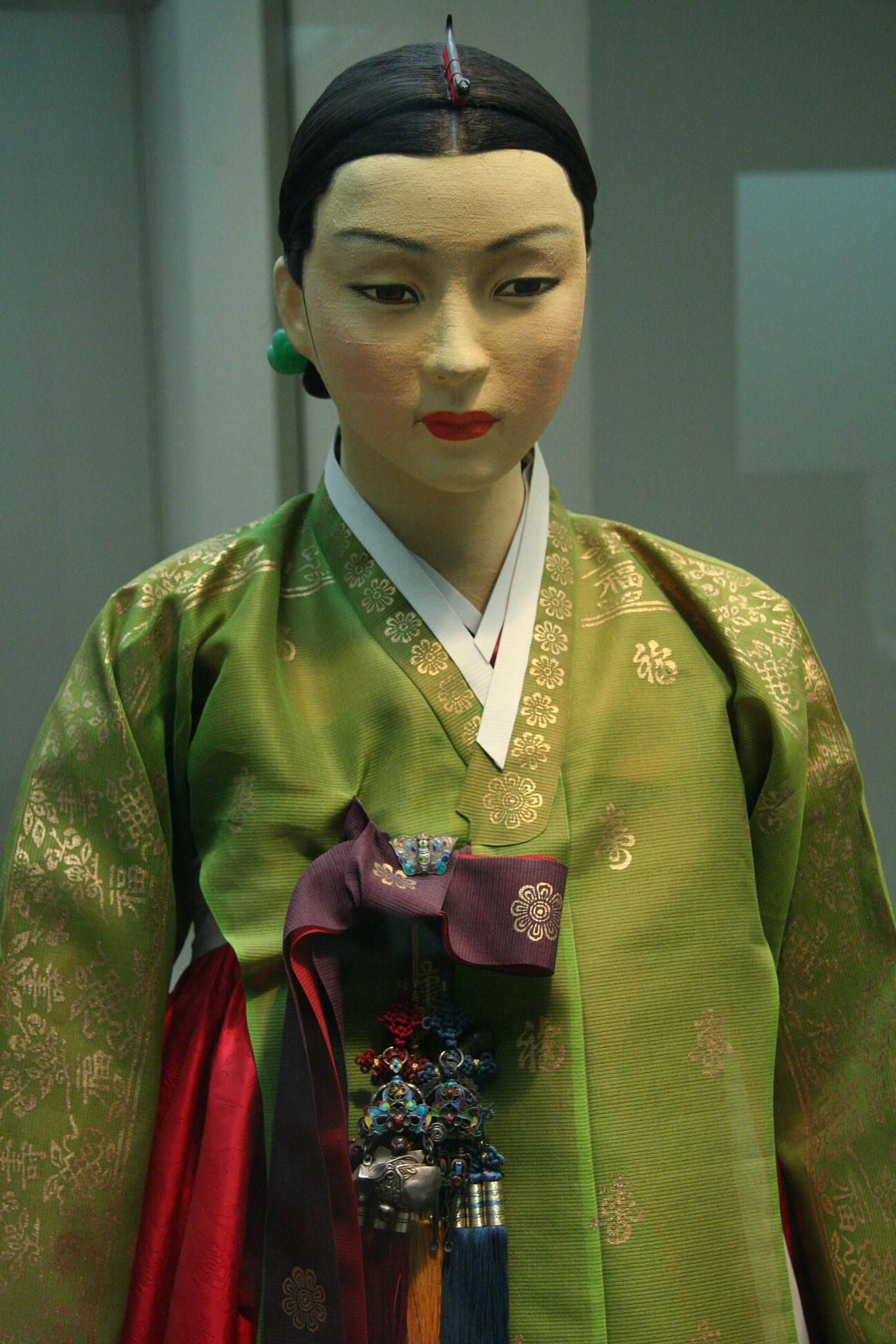
A model of a royal woman in a green dangui

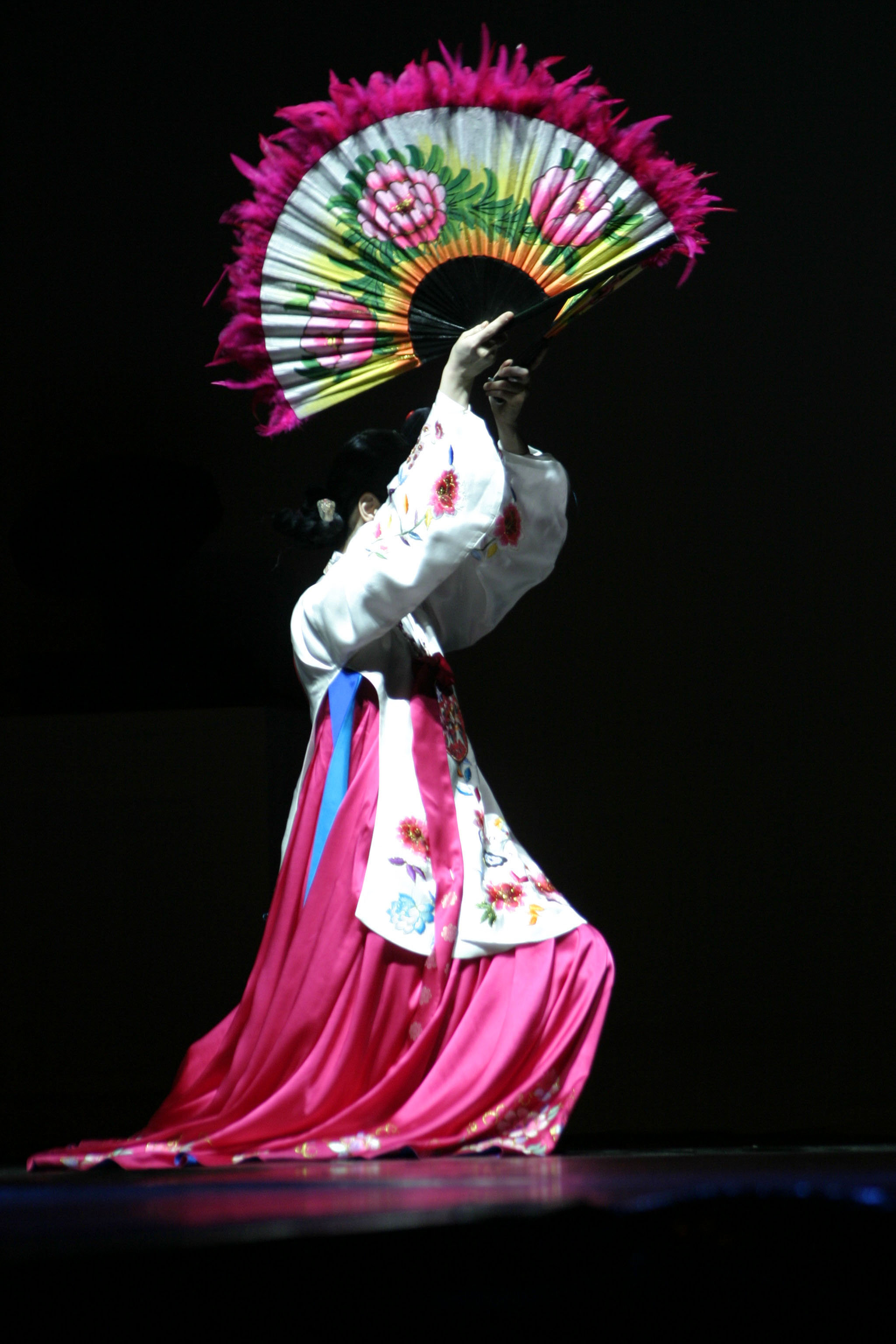
A dancer in a white dangui performing buchaechum (a fan dance)

== See also ==
- Jeogori
- Po
- Wonsam
- Hwarot
