= Chungin =

Korean middle-class caste

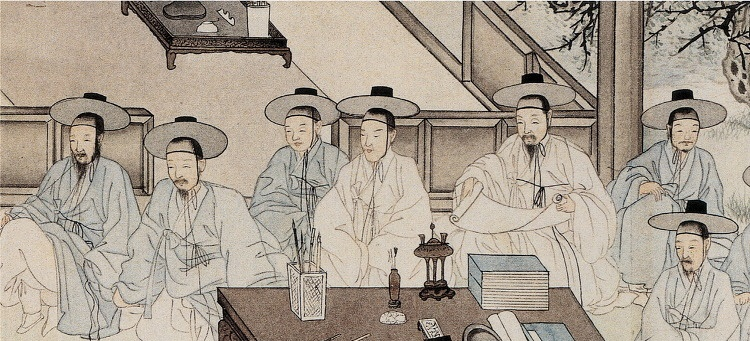

Korean name
- Hangul: 중인
- Hanja: 中人
- RR: jungin
- MR: chungin

The chungin (Korean: 중인; Hanja: 中人; lit. 'middle people') were the upper middle class of the Joseon Dynasty in medieval and early modern Korean society. This privileged class of commoners consisted of a small group of petty bureaucrats and other highly educated skilled workers whose technical and administrative skills enabled the yangban and the royal family to rule the lower classes. Chungin were the lifeblood of the Korean Confucian agrarian bureaucracy, on whom the upper classes depended on to maintain their vice-like hold on the people. Their traditions and habits are the forerunners of the modern Korean administrative systems in both North and South Korea.

== Professions and roles in the society ==
Joseon class system
Class	Hangul	Hanja	Status
Yangban	양반	兩班	noble class
Chungin	중인	中人	intermediate class
Sangmin	상민	常民	common people
Ch'ŏnmin	천민	賤民	lowborn people (nobi, paekchŏng, mudang, kisaeng, namsadang, etc.)

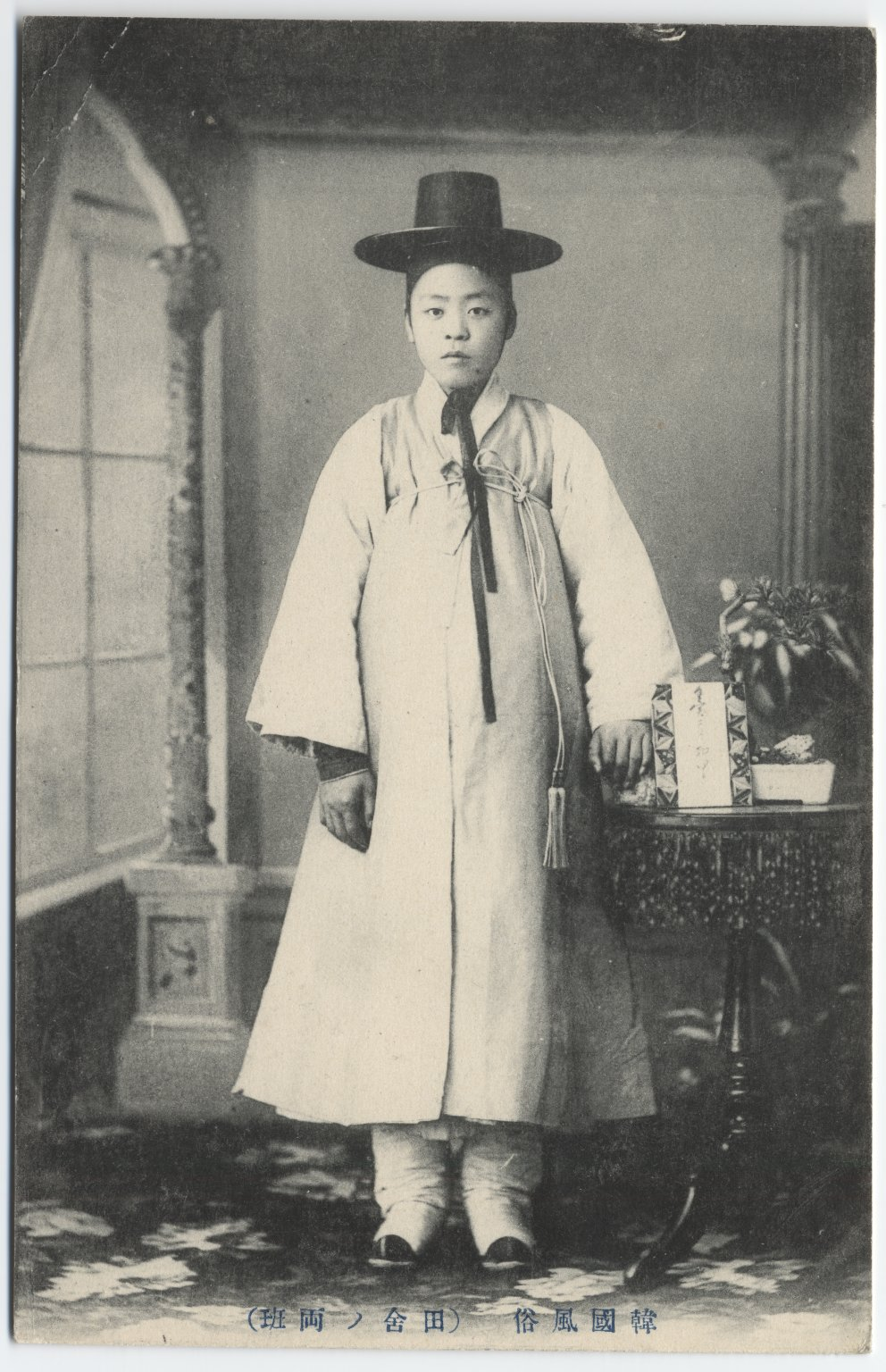
Young Korean man of the middle class, 1904

In dynastic Korea, particularly during the Joseon period, the chungin were lower than the yangban aristocracy but above the lower middle and working class commoners in social status. They included highly educated government-employed specialists with a status—comparable to modern white collar workers—military officers from or had marriage ties to the families producing technical specialists, hereditary government functionaries (both capital and local), and illegitimate children of aristocrats.

In everyday life, the chungin were below the aristocratic yangban but superior to the lower middle and working class sangmin. Their roles were minor technical and administrative officials who supported the structure of the government. The highest-ranking chungin, local functionaries, administratively enabled the yangban to oppress the lower classes, especially the total control they had over the sangmin. The chungin functioned as the middle-class and were essentially petty bureaucrats particularly in the rural areas.

Although inferior to the aristocracy in social standing, the highly educated chungin enjoyed far more privileges and influence than the lower middle and working class commoners. For example, the chungin were not taxed nor subject to military conscription. Like the yangban, they were allowed to live in the central part of the city, hence the name "middle people". Also, the chungin tended to marry within their own class as well as into the yangban class. In addition, since they were eligible to enter the palace as royal servants, it was possible for a chungin girl, if her father had a clean reputation or good connections and she was able to catch the King or Queen Dowager's eye, to become a royal consort or even a Royal Noble Consort, the second highest level in the hierarchy of the king's harem, after the Queen. An example is Royal Noble Consort Hui of the Indong Jang clan, personal name Jang Ok-jeong, was a consort of King Sukjong of Joseon and mother of Gyeongjong. She was the Queen of Joseon from 1689 until her deposition, in 1694.

However, to become a chungin, passing the chapkwa examination, which tested their practical knowledge of certain skills, was usually required. The chungin were the smallest social class in dynastic Korea.

== Culture impact on Korean literature ==
Chungin were highly educated like yangban, and though they were never regarded the same level or social status, they would receive help from the yangban people who enjoyed their poems to get them published. Moreover, from being less acknowledged than the yangban class, they were discriminated against as well. As chungin were being unfairly treated for their status in society, they wanted more acknowledgement in society and created a poetry group; heir work can be seen in the ancient books, “Okgyeiseungcheop” and “Okgyecheongyucheop.” Alongside, They would go on to publish their first collection of poems, “Sodaepungyo,” and would continue to release a new collection every 60 years.

A literature collection, Recitation of Miscellanies by Six Poets, talks about the level of the poet’s literary talents compared to their place in society. Despite their differences, development of The Songsogwon Poetry Society led to a closer interaction between the yangban and chungin societal classes. During the late seventeenth century many chungin gained a bit of popularity by writing poetry. They would write poetry about their lives as poets and sometimes the people in the higher society would spread their poetry among the others. Even though they shared these poems and were liked by others, it still did not allow them to gain more favor in society and they remained as chungin. Remaining Pearls of Korea was a set of poems put together by a chungin who was encouraged by a yangban to get it together.

Kim Ch'ŏnt'aek, a notable sijo author during the Joseon period, was a Pogyo constable during the reign of King Sukjong. Kim compiled the text Ch'ŏngguyŏngŏn and was known for memorizing hundreds of works from Sigyeong. Kim was a highly skilled singer with great knowledge in arts who touched the nation's people to tears with his singing. As a member of the chungin class during his period, he was not able to advance in society therefore choose to live with nature. Kim knew this because of the social stratification in the Joseon Dynasty, and settled to live amongst what nature had to offer most chungin people. In his sijo, Kim incorporated elements of nature; in his sijo about a white seagull (english translation below) he expresses that as a member of the chungin class, he will live with nature.

== Famous chungin ==
Chungin were prominent especially in the late nineteenth and early twentieth centuries when they tended to welcome Western institutions and ideas for modernizing Korea.

- Yu Dae-chi (a.k.a. Yu Hong-gi)
- Oh Gyeong-sok and his son, Oh Se-chang
- Byeon Su
- Kim Kyu-sik
- Choe Nam-seon

== See also ==
- Daeryeong Suksu
