= Wonsam =

Traditional Korean clothing

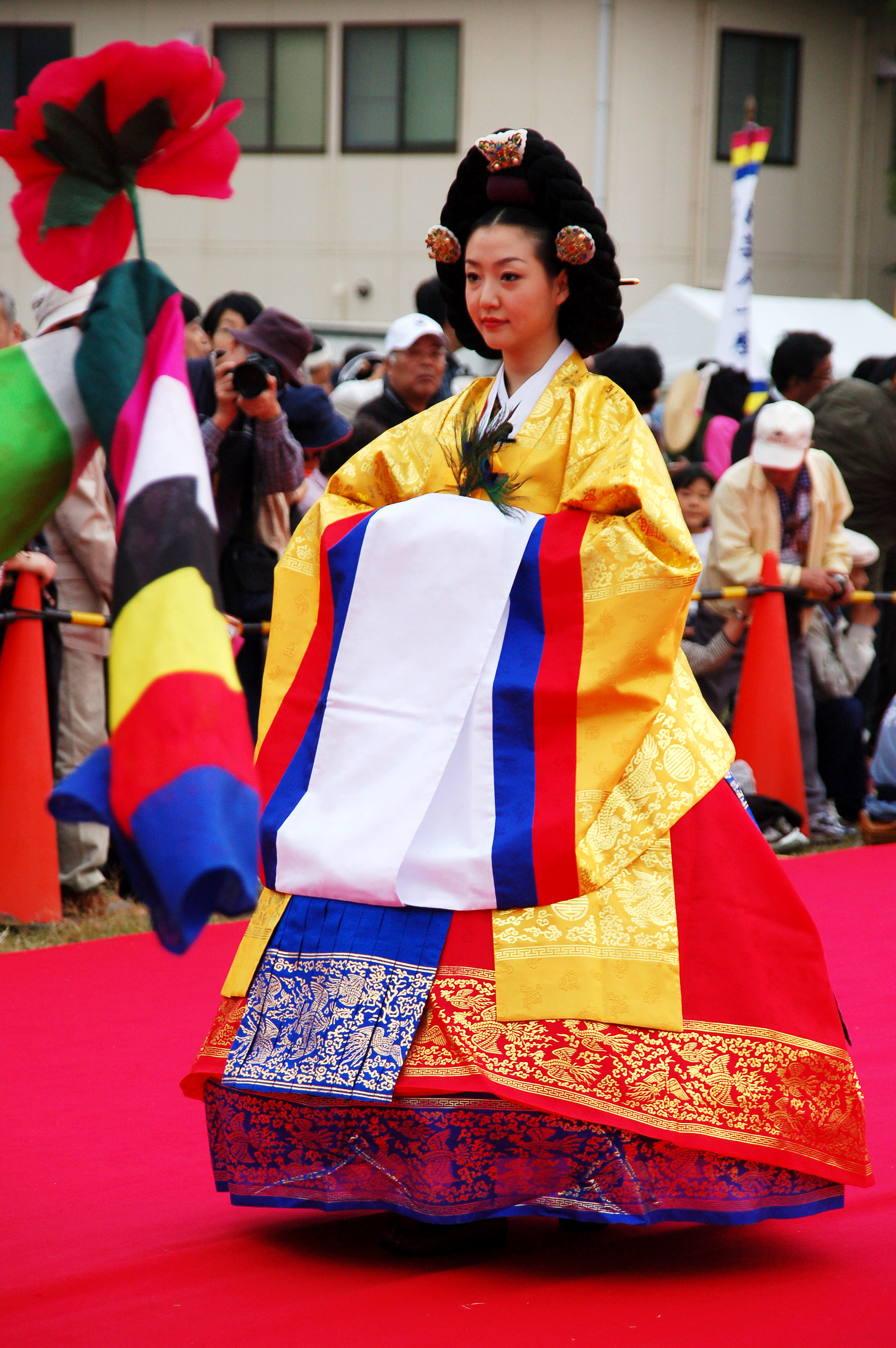
- Hwangwonsam (Yellow wonsam)

Korean name
- Hangul: 원삼
- Hanja: 圓衫
- RR: wonsam
- MR: wŏnsam

The wonsam is a female ceremonial topcoat in hanbok. It originated from China, and it was worn by queens, high-ranking court ladies, and royalty during the Joseon dynasty of Korea (1392–1910). It is also called 'daeui' (大衣, big clothing), 'daesu' (大袖, wide sleeves) and 'jangsam' (長衫, long clothing). The queen, princess consort, and consort to the first son of the crown prince wore it as a soryebok, a robe for small ceremonies, while wives of high officers and sanggung (court matrons) wore it as daeryebok, a robe for major ceremonies. It was also worn by commoners on their wedding ceremony.

== Origins and development ==
=== Origins ===
The wonsam originated from China and is believed to be one of the clothing of the Tang dynasty introduced in the Unified Three Kingdom periods of Korea. Since then, it has become part of the Korean national customs.

According to Hong Nayoung, the wonsam is also hypothesized to have originated from another garment called dansam (unlined jacket), which was used in early Joseon and originated from China. The Chinese Ming dynasty bestowed the ceremonial attire and daily clothing to the Joseon queens from the reign of King Munjong to the reign of King Seonjo whenever a new king was enthroned; the bestowed clothing included o (襖), gun (裙), and dansam. The bestowed dansam was initially worn by the queen as a form of daily clothing and was also referred as wonsam occasionally; later on, the term wonsam became the fixed name for the garment.

=== Development ===
Throughout the Joseon dynasty, the form and shape of the wonsam evolved with time. The formative characteristics of the wonsam can be divided into four stages:

1. 15th–16th century AD wonsam: the wonsam in this period included the a danryeong-shaped wonsam, a form of wonsam which was similar to the danryeong and included danryeong collars, side pleats (called Moo) with multiple inner folds, straight sleeves in the shape of cylinders and a belt which was tied with the wonsam.
2. Early 17th – Mid 17th century AD wonsam (which also be referred as the transitional wonsam): it was a complex combination of the danryeong and what is known as wonsam; during this period, many forms and shapes were developed in short period of time. This transitional wonsam was a stepping-stone to the late development of the wonsam in the later years.
3. Mid 17th century AD wonsam – 19th century wonsam: The shape of the wonsam became more stable; during this period, the wonsam had collars which faced each other, and big and wide sleeves with stripes of multiple colours. It also featured hansam (i.e. a curve-edge side seams) and side pleats (moo) without any multiple inner folds. The clothing also changed from single-layered to double layeres, and new colours such as dark blue to green colour appeared.
4. Late 19th to 20th century AD wonsam: The characteristics and fabrics used in the wonsam became more standard, and there were now two types of wonsam: (1) the ceremonial robe used in court, and (2) the wonsam used by commoners as ceremonial robe on their wedding.

== Design and construction ==
The color and decorations of the garment around the chest, shoulders and back represent the wearer's rank. For example, the colour yellow was used for the wonsam of empresses, red for queens, jajeok (紫赤 magenta) for concubines and princess consorts, and green for princesses and women of the noble yangban class. After being popularised by royalty, commoners were granted permission to wear wonsam at weddings only, only the green wonsam.

Varieties of silk were used as the fabric. Wonsam for winter were made with dan (緞), a thick silk with a glossy surface formed with a satin weave, and wonsam for summer were made with sa (紗), a loosely woven silk.

Unlike the po, an indigenous Korean overcoat with narrow sleeves, the wonsam was based on women’s half-sleeve round collar robe that was worn in 15th century. After the Qing invasion of Joseon, its sleeves have gotten longer and wider. As an adaptation from the original model, the wonsam gradually evolved into a distinctive form characteristic of traditional Korean clothing.

== Modern use ==
Today the wonsam is worn primarily in representations of Joseon royal ceremonies and as a wedding garment, and in a much simplified version when performing traditional Korean dances.

== Gallery ==
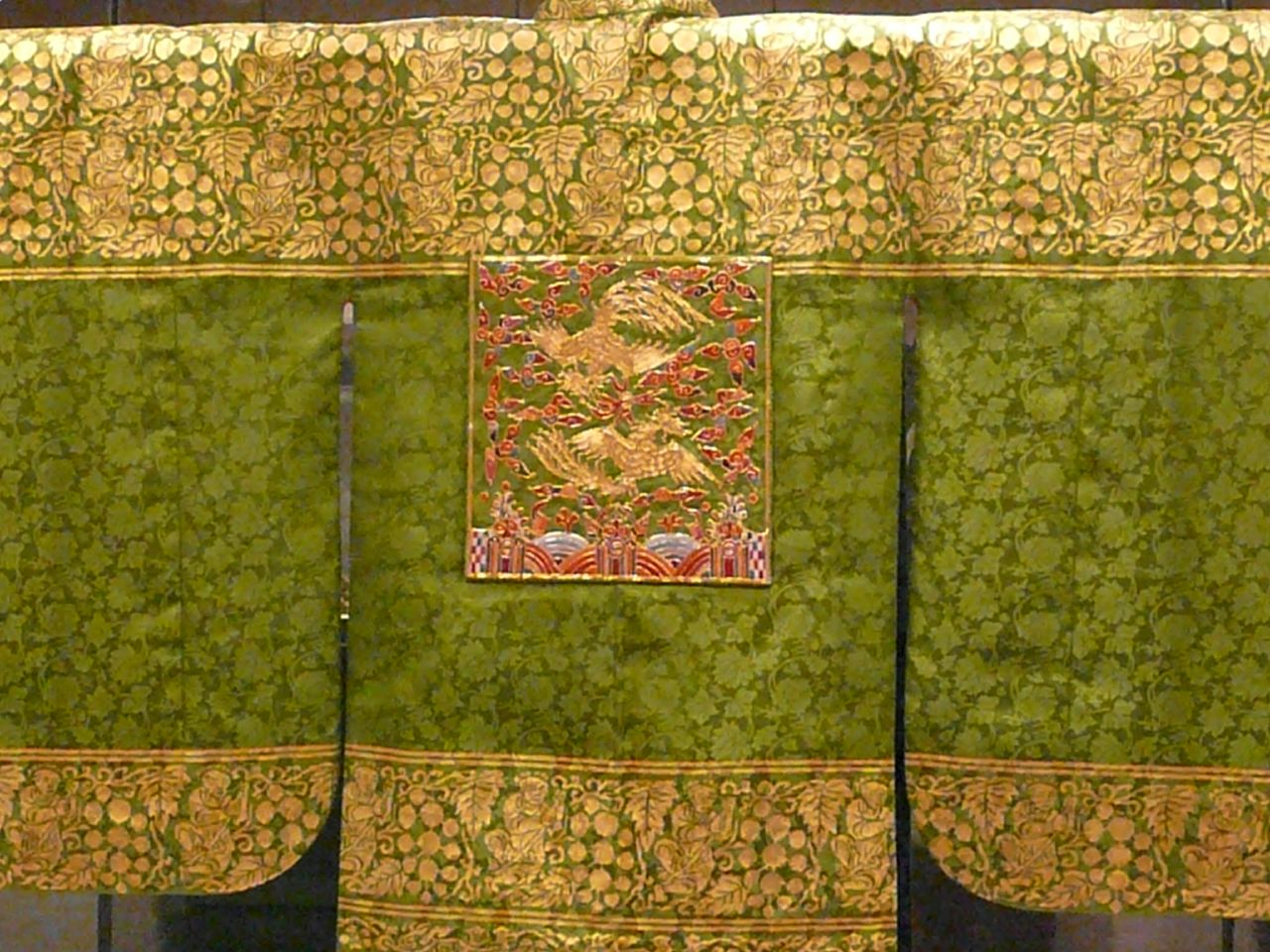
Nokwonsam (green wonsam) for a princess

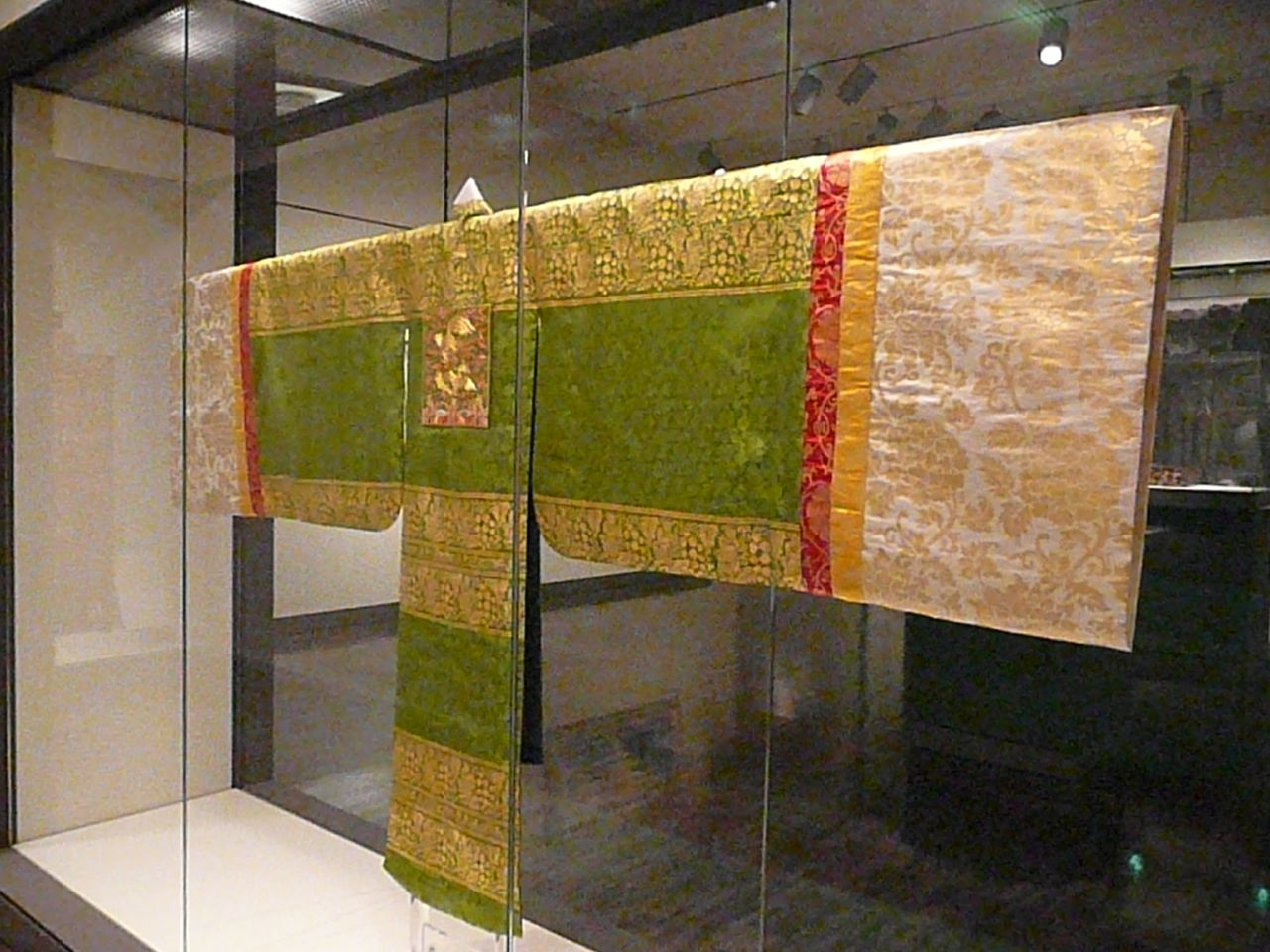
Nokwonsam exhibited at Asian Art Museum of San Francisco

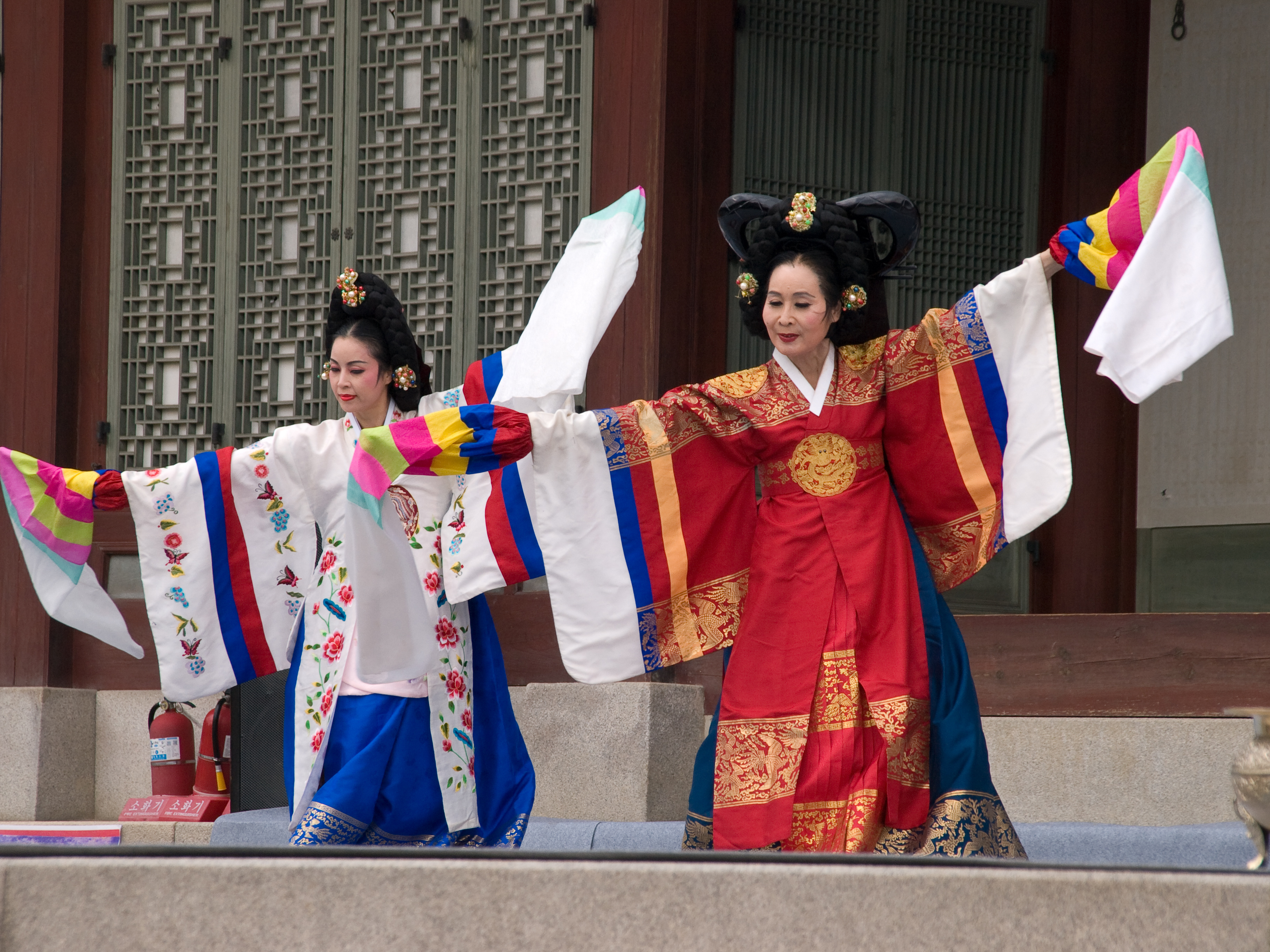
Dancers in wonsam performing a Korean dance, Taepyeongmu

== See also ==
- Dangui
- Gache
- Hwarot
- List of Korean clothing
