= Early modern literature =

16th–early 18th-century literature

The history of literature of the early modern period (16th, 17th and partly 18th century literature), or early modern literature, succeeds Medieval literature, and in Europe in particular Renaissance literature.

In Europe, the Early Modern period lasts roughly from 1550 to 1750, spanning the Baroque period and ending with the Age of Enlightenment and the wars of the French Revolution. The Early Modern period in Persia corresponds to the rule of the Safavid dynasty. In Japan, the "Early Modern period" (Edo period) is taken to last down to 1868 (the beginning of Industrialization during the Meiji period). In India, the Mughal era lasts until the establishment of the British Raj in 1857. The Ottoman Empire underwent various attempts of modernization from 1828 (Tanzimat).

Chinese literature of the Qing dynasty remains mostly unaffected by European influence, and effects of modernization that would lead up to the New Culture Movement became apparent only from the Late Qing period in the 1890s.

== Europe ==
A new spirit of science and investigation in Europe was part of a general upheaval in human understanding, which began with the discovery of the New World in 1492 and continues through the subsequent centuries, even up to the present day.

The form of writing now commonplace across the world—the novel—originated from the early modern period and grew in popularity in the next century. Before the modern novel became established as a form there first had to be a transitional stage when "novelty" began to appear in the style of the epic poem.

Plays for entertainment (as opposed to religious enlightenment) returned to Europe's stages in the early modern period. William Shakespeare is the most notable of the early modern playwrights, but numerous others made important contributions, including Pierre Corneille, Molière, Jean Racine, Pedro Calderón de la Barca, Lope de Vega and Christopher Marlowe. From the 16th to the 18th century commedia dell'arte performers improvised in the streets of Italy and France. Some Commedia dell'arte plays were written down. Both the written plays and the improvisation were influential upon literature of the time, particularly upon the work of Molière. Shakespeare drew upon the arts of jesters and strolling players in creating new style comedies. All the parts, even the female ones, were played by men (en travesti) but that would change, first in France and then in England too, by the end of the 17th century.

The earliest work considered an opera in the sense the work is usually understood dates from around 1597. It is Dafne, (now lost) written by Jacopo Peri for an elite circle of literate Florentine humanists who gathered as the "Camerata".

Miguel de Cervantes's Don Quixote de la Mancha has been called "the first novel" by many literary scholars (or the first of the modern European novels). It was published in two parts. The first part was published in 1605 and the second in 1615. It might be viewed as a parody of Le Morte d'Arthur (and other examples of the chivalric romance), in that the novel form would be the direct result of poking fun at a collection of heroic folk legends. This is fully in keeping with the spirit of the age of enlightenment which began from about this time and delighted in giving a satirical twist to the stories and ideas of the past. This trend toward satirising previous writings was only made possible by the printing press. Without the invention of mass-produced copies of a book it would not be possible to assume the reader will have seen the earlier work and will thus understand the references within the text. In the 18th century Daniel Defoe and Jonathan Swift wrote famous novels.

The 16th century saw outstanding epic poems of Torquato Tasso and Luís de Camões. Later the most well-known poets were Juana Inés de la Cruz, John Milton and Alexander Pope. In turn Jean de La Fontaine and Charles Perrault are appreciated for their fables.

== Ottoman Empire ==
The two primary streams of Ottoman written literature are poetry and prose. Of the two, poetry—specifically, Divan poetry—was by far the dominant stream. Moreover, until the 19th century, Ottoman prose did not contain any examples of fiction; that is, there were no counterparts to, for instance, the European romance, short story, or novel (though analogous genres did, to some extent, exist in both the Turkish folk tradition and in Divan poetry).

Ottoman Divan poetry was a highly ritualized and symbolic art form. From the Persian poetry that largely inspired it, it inherited a wealth of symbols whose meanings and interrelationships—both of similitude (مراعات نظير mura'ât-i nazîr / تناسب tenâsüb) and opposition (تضاد tezâd)—were more or less prescribed.

Until the 19th century, Ottoman prose never managed to develop to the extent that contemporary Divan poetry did. A large part of the reason for this was that much prose was expected to adhere to the rules of sec' (سجع, also transliterated as seci), or rhymed prose, a type of writing descended from the Arabic saj' and which prescribed that between each adjective and noun in a sentence, there must be a rhyme.

Nevertheless, there was a tradition of prose in the literature of the time. This tradition was exclusively nonfictional in nature—the fiction tradition was limited to narrative poetry.

== Persia ==
Regarding the tradition of Persian love poetry during the Safavid era, Persian historian Ehsan Yarshater notes, "As a rule, the beloved is not a woman, but a young man. In the early centuries of Islam, the raids into Central Asia produced many young slaves. Slaves were also bought or received as gifts. They were made to serve as pages at court or in the households of the affluent, or as soldiers and bodyguards. Young men, slaves or not, also, served wine at banquets and receptions, and the more gifted among them could play music and maintain a cultivated conversation. It was love toward young pages, soldiers, or novices in trades and professions which was the subject of lyrical introductions to panegyrics from the beginning of Persian poetry, and of the ghazal."

After the 15th century, the Indian style of Persian poetry (sometimes also called Isfahani or Safavi styles) took over. This style has its roots in the Timurid era and produced the likes of Amir Khosrow Dehlavi, and Bhai Nand Lal Goya.

== India ==
Classical Sanskrit literature went into decline in the High Middle Ages, to the benefit of Middle Indic vernaculars such as Old Hindi, notably in use for Late Medieval Bhakti poetry. The Mughal era sees the development of various literary dialects such as Dakkhini or Urdu, the latter showing heavy Persian influence. The earliest examples of Khariboli can be seen in some of Kabir and Amir Khusro's lines. More developed forms of Khariboli can be seen in some mediocre literature produced in early 18th century. Examples are Chand Chhand Varnan Ki Mahima by Gangabhatt, Yogavashishtha by Ramprasad Niranjani, Gora-Badal ki katha by Jatmal, Mandovar ka varnan by Anonymous, a translation of Ravishenacharya's Jain Padmapuran by Daulatram (dated 1824).

== China ==
- Ming dynasty
  - Gui Youguang 歸有光 (1506–1571)
  - Yuan Hongdao 袁宏道( 1568–1610)
  - Xu Xiake 徐霞客 (1586–1641)
  - Gao Qi 高啟
  - Zhang Dai 張岱
  - Tu Long 屠隆
  - Wen Zhenheng 文震亨
- Qing dynasty
  - Fang Pao 方苞 (1668–1749)
  - Liu Dakui 劉大櫆 (1698–1779)
  - Yao Nai 姚鼐 (1731–1815)
  - Yuan Mei 袁枚 (1716–1798)
  - Gong Zizhen 龔自珍 (1792–1841)
  - Wei Yuan 魏源 (1794–1857)

== Japan ==
Literature during the largely peaceful Edo Period, in large part to the rise of the working and middle classes in the new capital of Edo (modern Tokyo), developed forms of popular drama which would later evolve into kabuki. The joruri and kabuki dramatist Chikamatsu Monzaemon became popular at the end of the 17th century. Matsuo Bashō wrote Oku no Hosomichi (奥の細道, 1702), a travel diary. Hokusai, perhaps Japan's most famous woodblock print artist, also illustrated fiction as well as his famous 36 Views of Mount Fuji.

Many genres of literature made their début during the Edo Period, helped by a rising literacy rate among the growing population of townspeople, as well as the development of lending libraries. Although there was a minor Western influence trickling into the country from the Dutch settlement at Nagasaki, it was the importation of Chinese vernacular fiction that proved the greatest outside influence on the development of Early Modern Japanese fiction. Ihara Saikaku might be said to have given birth to the modern consciousness of the novel in Japan, mixing vernacular dialogue into his humorous and cautionary tales of the pleasure quarters. Jippensha Ikku wrote Tōkaidōchū Hizakurige, which is a mix of travelogue and comedy. Tsuga Teisho, Takebe Ayatari, and Okajima Kanzan were instrumental in developing the yomihon, which were historical romances almost entirely in prose, influenced by Chinese vernacular novels such as Three Kingdoms and Shui hu zhuan. Two yomihon masterpieces were written by Ueda Akinari: Ugetsu monogatari and Harusame monogatari.

== See also ==
- 16th century in literature
- 17th century in literature
- Renaissance literature
