= Yuan Zhongdao =

Chinese poet, essayist, travel diarist and official

Collected Works

Yuan Zhongdao (Chinese: 袁中道; 1570–1624), courtesy name Xiaoxiu (小修) or Shaoxiu (少修), art name Chaizi Jushi (柴紫居士), was a Chinese poet, essayist, travel diarist, and official of the Ming dynasty. He was born in Gong'an, Huguang.

== History ==
He shares his fame with two other brothers, Yuan Zongdao (1560–1600) and Yuan Hongdao (1568–1610); they are collectively known as the Three Yuan Brothers. The three brothers dominated the literature of the period. From a family of financial means, they printed and distributed their own works. The youngest of the brothers, Yuan Zhongdao, took years in his pursuit of a civil-service examination degree. The brothers were all openly ambivalent about social position. Yuan Zhongdao spent quantities of money on boats for his extended excursions. His brothers and their families were haunted by disease. Yuan Zhongdao's own life was a story of breakdown at the cumulative stress of family deaths and repeated failure at the civil service examination.

Yuan Zhongdao's principal health problem was perhaps tuberculosis. Yuan Zhongdao would record extremes of mood within even a daily period suggesting perhaps bipolar disorder. Yuan Zhongdao was denied the complete rest he needed for such a condition due to pressing family needs. Yuan's diary, Yu chü-fei lu (Travels on Board a Boat) is his literary monument. Yuan's precarious physical and psychological condition provided the background for his preoccupation with longevity and stress avoidance. He avoided a Buddhistic vegetarian diet, perceiving a need for protein in his diet. Excessive drinking and too many wives were other perceived impediments. His travel diary is full of such detail. Yuan records an early reading of the celebrated novel Jin Ping Mei (The Golden Lotus). He was likewise associated with the radical philosopher Li Zhi 李贄 (1527–1602) and his espousals of popular literature. Likewise Yuan Zhongdao had the acquaintance of the Jesuit missionary Matteo Ricci (1552–1610). In 1616 he passed the Imperial examination and obtained a succession of official posts.

== Poetry ==
"Record of a Dream"

The road before me completely dark;
I know not where I am.
Black water vast without bounds;
No raft to sail upon.
Above I cannot see the heavens;
Below I cannot see the earth.
Hear the growl of a mad dog;
Right in my path he faces me and barks.
On all sides not a soul to be seen;
Again I try to seek the road back;
Long and long for my old home.
Black, black are the surrounding pines;
Enter main rooms and hear no voices;
Go through the side rooms and see no one.
Grass is matted and chokes the courtyard;
Wind is mournful and blows all around.
Something or maybe nothing; I'm alarmed.
Going in I can't find anyone; outside all is unclear.
Slowly, slowly, where I've been recedes;
My dreaming soul returns and I sweat like rain.

== Prose writings ==
He was a notable author of the xiaopin, a form of short literary essay.

== Bibliography ==
=== Books ===
- Mair, Victor H. (ed.) (2001). The Columbia History of Chinese Literature. New York: Columbia University Press. ISBN 0-231-10984-9. (Amazon Kindle edition.)

=== Articles ===
- Carpenter, Bruce E., "Yüan Chung-tao and the Seventeenth-Century Life", Tezukayama University Review (Tezukayama daigaku ronshū), Nara, Japan, no. 64, 1989, pp. 21–37. ISSN 0385-7743
