= Xiaopin (literary genre) =

In Chinese literature, xiaopin (小品, Wade-Giles: hsiao-p'in) is a form of short essay, usually non-fictional, and usually being exclusively composed in prose. The form is comparable to that of Tsurezuregusa by the Japanese monk Yoshida Kenkō. The genre flourished in the late Ming and early Qing dynasties.

== Notable practitioners ==
The following authors are considered among the most notable historical practitioners of the genre:

- Gui Youguang (1506–1571)
- Lu Shusheng (1509–1605)
- Xu Wei (1521–1593)
- Li Zhi (1527–1602)
- Tu Long (1542–1605)
- Chen Jiru (1558–1639)
- Yuan Zongdao (1569–1600)
- Yuan Hongdao (1568–1610)
- Yuan Zhongdao (1570–1624)
- Zhong Xing (1574–1624)
- Li Liufang (1575–1629)
- Wang Siren (1575–1646)
- Tan Yuan-chun (1585–1637)
- Zhang Dai (1597–1684?)

== Subjects ==
Victor Mair wrote in 1999 that

[the authors of hsiao-p'in] wrote about such topics as wars, temples, belvederes, gazebos, huts, scholars, maids, courtesans, actors, storytellers, ventriloquists, dogs, calligraphy, stationery, bamboo, canes, trips to the countryside, attendants, fools, paintings, portraits, poetry, retirement, old age, death, dreams, the mind of a child, peach blossoms, flowers, excursions, brooks, lakes, ponds, mountains, drinking, and all manner of books.

== Bibliography ==
- Mair, Victor H. (ed.) (2001). The Columbia History of Chinese Literature. New York: Columbia University Press. ISBN 0-231-10984-9. (Amazon Kindle edition.)
