= Lu Shusheng =

Ming scholar-official

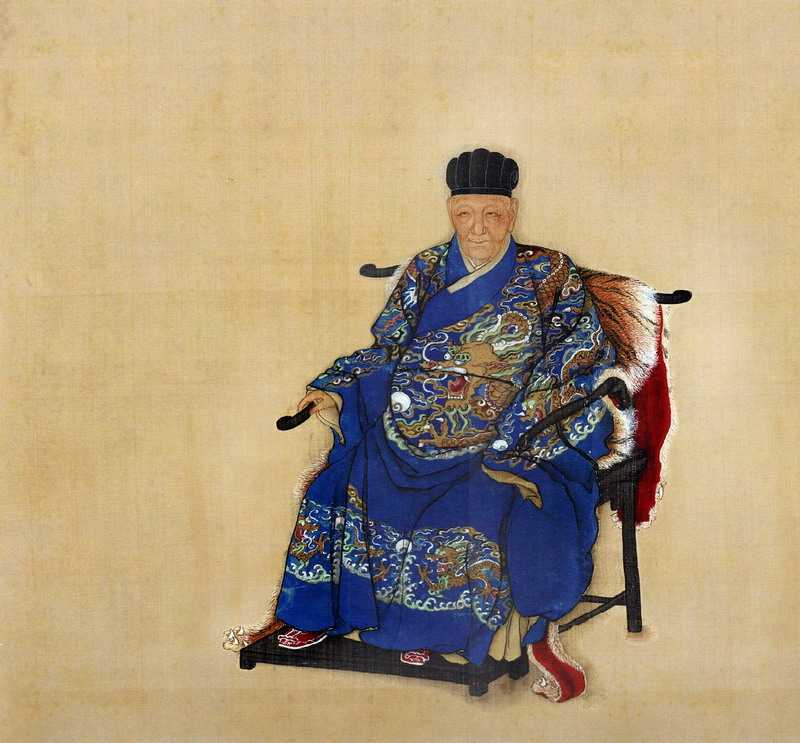
Lu Shusheng (Shengchao Songjiang bangyan huaxiang ce), wearing daopao with dragon patterns

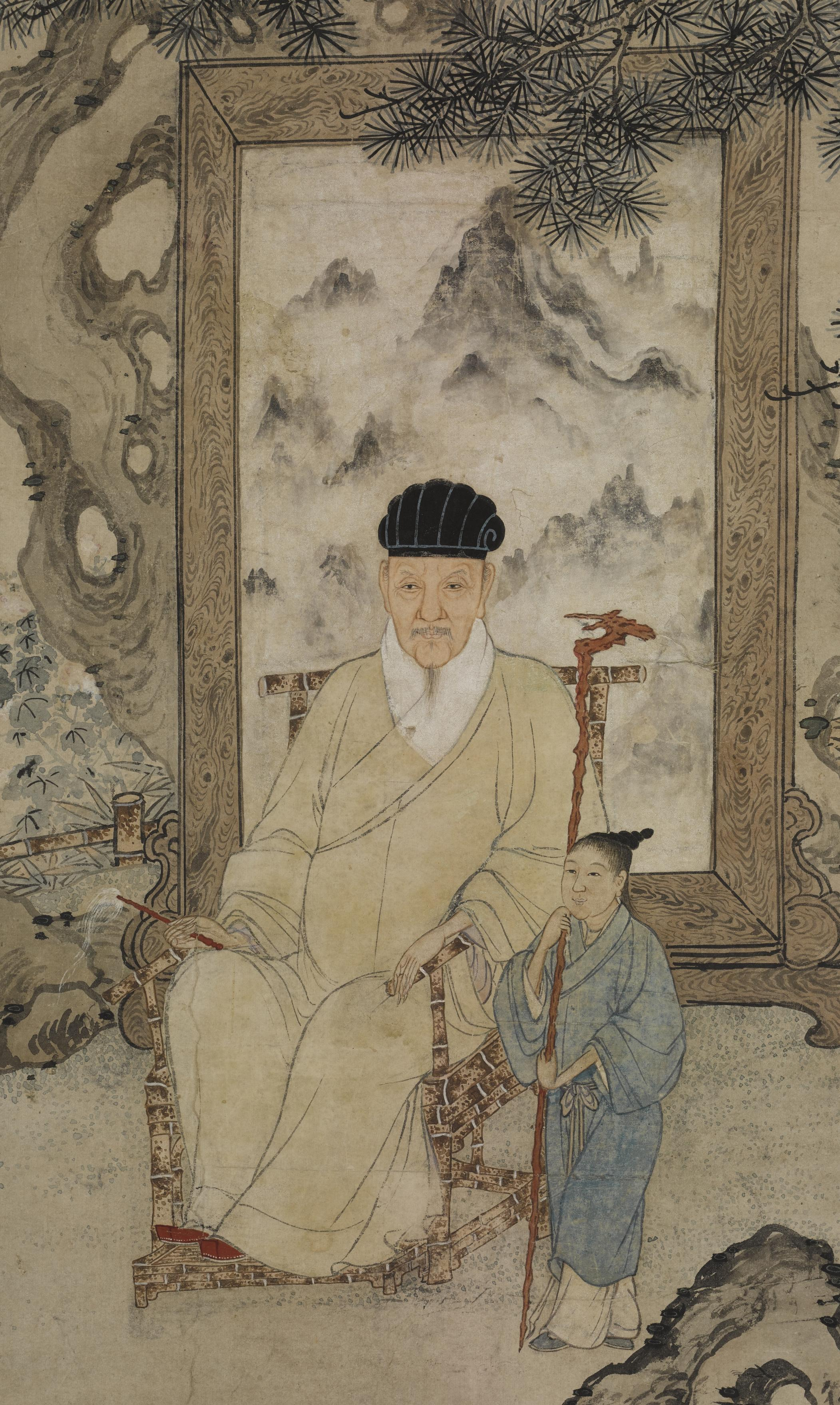
Lu Shusheng (detail of a painting by Ye Shifang 叶时芳)

Lu Xueshi zazhu 10 zhong 陸學士雜著十種

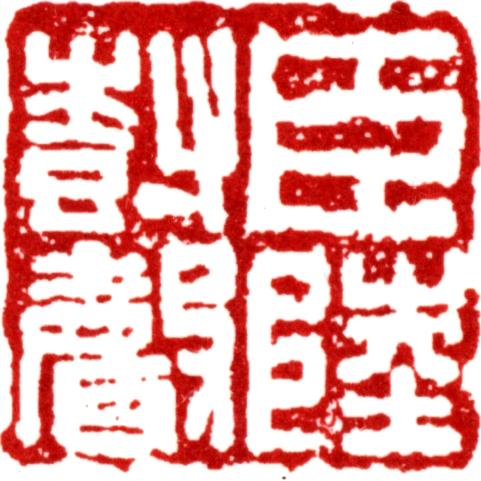
"Official Lu Shusheng" (seal)

Lu Shusheng (simplified Chinese: 陆树声; traditional Chinese: 陸樹聲; pinyin: Lù Shùshēng; Wade–Giles: Lu Shu-sheng; 1509–1605) was a scholar-official of the Ming Dynasty, having obtained the Jinshi degree and serving shortly as minister in the Ministry of Rites (libu shangshu 禮部尚書). He was from Zhujia Village 朱家村, Huating (华亭) in prefecture of Songjiang (present-day Zhujiajiao (朱 家角镇), Qingpu District, Shanghai).

He was born into a poor family. His courtesy name (zi) was Yuji (与吉), an other Weiji (维吉), his hao was Pingquan 平泉, and additionally went by the names Wuzheng Jushi (无诤居士), Changshui Yuyin (长水渔隐), Shiyuan Zhuren (适园主人), Jiushan Shanren (九山山人), and Daxiesheng (大歇生).

At the time of Xu Jie and Gao Gong successively serving as chief ministers, Lu Shusheng had no interest in currying favor. He repeatedly declined office under the pretext of illness. Paradoxically, this greatly enhanced his reputation and influence.

The Ming-scholar Chen Jiru (1558–1639), a close friend and fellow native of Huating, wrote a biographical note of his mentor Lu, who was befriended with many younger poets and writers.

== Works ==
The Hanyu da zidian (HYDZD) f.e. is using his works in the following editions:

- Bingta wuyan 病榻寤言 (Yanyun jiayi bian 砚云甲乙编),
- Changshui richao 长水日钞 (Lu Xueshi zazhu 陆学士杂著),
- Shiyuan zazhu 适园杂著 (Lu Xueshi zazhu 陆学士杂著).

An other work was his 'tea classic' Chaliao ji 茶寮記 (A Record of the Tea Retreat).

Chinaknowledge is listing his works Pingquan tiba 平泉題跋, Jigu congyu 汲古叢語, Maoyu zashi 耄餘雜識, Changshui richao 長水日鈔 and Lu Xueshi zazhu 陸學士雜著, mentioning that his collected writings are titled Lu Wending gong ji 陸文定公集.

Many of Lu's works are incorporated in the collectaneum Baoyantang miji 寶顏堂秘笈 (roughly “The Private Library of Baoyan Hall”) compiled by Chen Jiru.

== See also ==
- Libu shangshu (Chinese)
- Xiaopin (hsiao-p'in)
