= Kao Pan Yu Shi =

1590 book by Tu Long

- Chinese: 考槃余事
Transcriptions
Standard Mandarin
- Hanyu Pinyin: kǎo pán yú shì
- IPA: [kʰàʊ pʰǎn y̌ ʂî]

Kao Pan Yu Shi (Chinese: 考槃余事, Desultory Remarks on Furnishing the Abode of the Retired Scholar; also called Art of Refined Living or Pastimes Most Entertaining) is a 1590 compendium on the art of living by Ming dynasty author Tu Long (屠隆).

Desultory Remarks has fifteen treatises:

1. Calligraphy and books
2. Rubbings
3. Paintings
4. Paper
5. Ink
6. Brushes
7. Inkstones
8. Zithers
9. Incense
10. Tea
11. Potted plants
12. Fish and birds
13. Mountain studio
14. Necessities of life and dress
15. Utensils of the studio

Art historian Craig Clunas suggests that the Desultory Remarks is essentially a compendium on the art of living gathered from various other existing sources, such as Gao Lian's Eight Treatises on the Nurturing of Life, (for which Tu Long wrote a preface). Whether or not this is the case, Tu Long's discourses certainly had greater immediate recognition and influence; they were much more widely cited in later collections, and were a primary source for Wen Zhenheng's Treatise of Superfluous Things.
