= Tu Long =

Chinese writer (1542–1605)

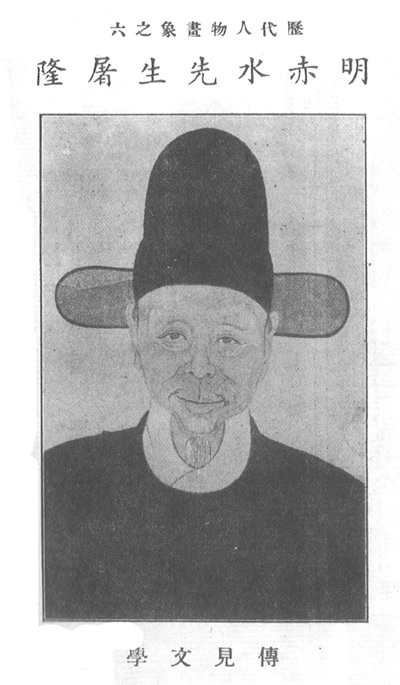
屠隆

Tu Long (Chinese: 屠隆; Wade-Giles: T'u Lung, 1542–1605), was a playwright and essayist who lived during the Ming Dynasty. He was born in Yin county (now Yin county, in suburb of Ningbo city, Zhejiang).

In 1577, Tu Long obtained the degree of jinshi. He later became the Chief Magistrate of Qingpu (now Qingpu county, Shanghai). He lost his position as Secretary of the Ministry of Rites after launching licentious parties with boy prostitutes; after that, he concentrated on writing plays and essays.

Tu Long rejected the adherence to strict ancient format, he advocated that a writer must write from his heart.

He lived 62–63 years.

== Works ==
- Drama: Tan Hua Ji, ("The Story of Udumbara")
- Drama: Cai Hau Ji, ("A Tale of Colorful Feather") about the Tang dynasty poet Li Bai 李白
- Poems: Bai Yu Ji, ("White Elm Collection")

He was a notable author of the xiaopin, a form of short literary essay.

Tu Long is best known internationally for his work on the art of living: Kao Pan Yu Shi, (考槃余事, "Desultory Remarks on Furnishing the Abode of the Retired Scholar"), first published in 1606. Desultory Remarks has fifteen treatises:

1. Calligraphy and books
2. Rubbings
3. Paintings
4. Paper
5. Ink
6. Brushes
7. Inkstones
8. Qin ("zithers")
9. Incense
10. Tea
11. Potted plants
12. Fish and birds
13. Mountain studio
14. Necessities of life and dress

15. Utensils of the studio

The art historian Craig Clunas suggests that the Desultory Remarks is essentially a compendium, gathered from other existing sources, such as Gao Lian's Eight Treatises on the Nurturing of Life, (for which Tu Long wrote a preface). Whether or not this is the case, Tu Long's discourses certainly had greater immediate recognition and influence; they were much more widely cited in later collections, and were a primary source for Wen Zhenheng's Treatise of Superfluous Things.

== Bibliography ==
- Mair, Victor H. (ed.) (2001). The Columbia History of Chinese Literature. New York: Columbia University Press. ISBN 0-231-10984-9. (Amazon Kindle edition.)
