= Zhuoyin Clumsy Mystic =

The earliest reference to the name Zhuo Yin (Chinese: 拙隐; pinyin: zhuōyǐn) is traced to the Ming Dynasty (1368–1644). Since the traditional English translation (Clumsy Mystic) does not reflect the wide semantic field of the name, the topic of its origin has generated some academic interest in the historical, linguistical and philosophical circles. This article attempts to summarize the findings.

== Clumsy – 拙 (zhuō) ==
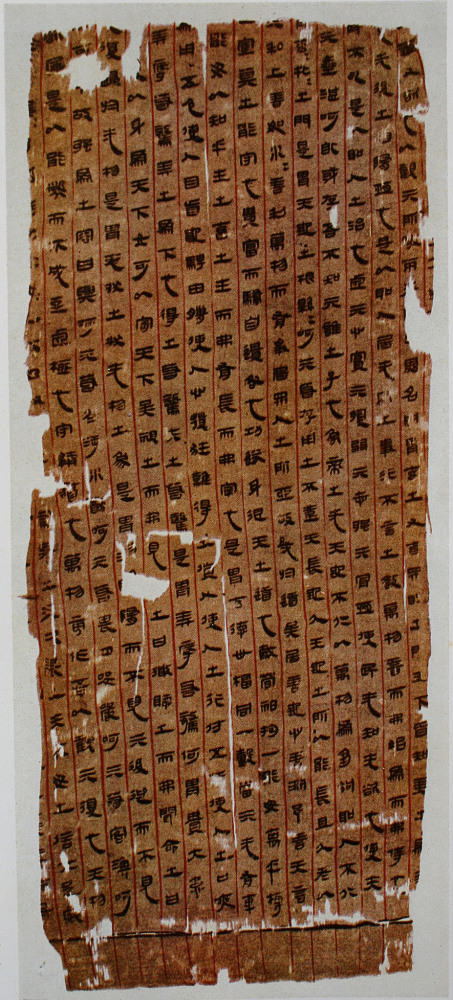
Ink on silk manuscript of the Tao Te Ching, unearthed from Mawangdui

Clumsiness in the Chinese culture has always been the attribute of a great skill. The Tao Te Ching (道德經), written around 6th century BC by the mystic, philosopher and poet Lao-Tzu (老子), says this in Chapter 45:

大成若缺、其用不弊。大盈若沖、其用不窮。大直若屈、大巧若拙、大辯若訥。躁勝寒、靜勝熱。淸靜爲天下正。

Great perfection seems flawed, yet functions without a hitch.
Great fullness seems empty, yet functions without exhaustion.
Great straightness seems bent,
Great skill seems clumsy,
Great eloquence seems stammering.
Excitement overcomes cold, stillness overcomes heat.

Clarity and stillness set everything right.

Chen Jiru (陳繼儒), a painter, philosopher and calligrapher during the Ming Dynasty in his work “Solitary Thoughts by a Small Window” (小窗幽) gives this advice:

藏巧於拙，用晦而明，寓清於濁，以屈為伸。 Hide skill in clumsiness, use dark to bring light, put clarity behind obscureness, bend and be straight.

== Mystic – 隱 (yǐn) ==
The character 隱, used as a noun, means mystery, hidden matters, secret, hint, thinking, hermit or recluse. Researchers believe that Yin in name Zhuo Yin comes from a poem by the Tang Dynasty poet Liu Cang (刘沧) :

My gift to the mystic from the Tiantai mountain (赠天台隐者)

獨尋危石坐岩中, You too should find steep cliffs to live among the rocks;
看書飲酒餘無事, Read books, drink wine and have no worries;
自樂樵漁狎釣翁. Find joy in gathering firewood, fishing and in friends.

Some linguists, however, argue that the last line of the poem was originally “Find joy in gathering firewood, and yoga and in friends”, because characters 瑜 (瑜伽, yoga) and 漁 (fishing) are both spelled yú and are homonyms in Mandarin. The error was introduced later by scribes who were unfamiliar with yoga, during the Qing Dynasty when Tang poetry anthologies were being compiled.

== The Seal ==
The official seal of Clumsy Mystic consists of two vertically oriented characters Zhuo and Yin written in the traditional Great Seal script (大篆) in the Zhuwen style (朱文, lit. “red characters”) that imprints the characters in red ink.|
