= Daopao =

Traditional Chinese attire for men

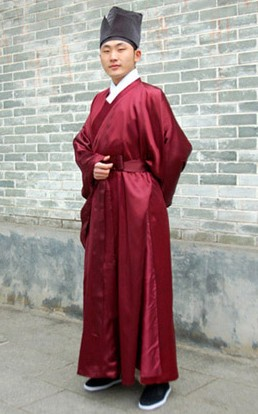
- Daopao (道袍)/ Xingyi (行衣) - formal wear for men

Chinese name
- Chinese: 道袍
- Literal meaning: Taoist robe
Transcriptions
Standard Mandarin
- Hanyu Pinyin: dàopáo

Korean name
- Hangul: 도포
- Hanja: 道袍
- Literal meaning: Taoist robe
Transcriptions
- Revised Romanization: dopo

English name
- English: Taoist robe

Daopao (Chinese: 道袍; pinyin: dàopáo; lit. 'Taoist robe'), also known as xízi (Chinese: 褶子) when used as a Xifu during Chinese opera performances, and deluo (Chinese: 得罗) when it is blue in colour, is a traditional form of paofu in Hanfu and is also one of the most distinctive form of traditional clothing for the Han Chinese. The daopao was one of the most common traditional form of outer robe worn by men. Daopao literally means "Taoist robe"; however, despite its name, the daopao were and is worn by men, and did not imply that its wearer had some affiliation to taoism. The daopao can be dated back to at least the Ming dynasty but had actually been worn since the Song dynasty. Initially the daopao was a form of casual clothing which was worn by the middle or lower class in the Ming dynasty. In the middle and late Ming, it was one of the most common form of robes worn by men as casual clothing. The daopao was also a popular formal wear by the Ming dynasty scholars in their daily lives. It was also the daily clothing for the literati scholars in the Ming dynasty. In the late Ming, it was also a popular form of clothing among the external officials and eunuchs sometimes wore it. The daopao was also introduced in Korea during the Joseon period, where it became known as dopo and was eventually localized in its current form.

The daopao can also refer to a type of Daojiao fushi, which were worn by practitioners of taoism, when the term is used in its literal form. This form of daopao worn taoist practitioners and taoist monks continued to be worn in the Qing dynasty as they were exempted from the Tifayifu policy. The daopao of the Taoist also continue to be worn by modern taoist priests, although it may come in different names.

== Daopao in Hanfu ==
=== History and origins ===
Some sources posit that a form of daopao without a cord had evolved from the kuzhe, which refers to the military-style garments which had supposedly been influenced by the northern nomad warriors from the north in the past. According to Antonia Finnane who noted the Gubu gulu (觚不觚錄) of Wang Shizhen (1526-1590), the three robes which evolved from the kuzhe-style was the yesa, the chengziyi (程子衣) worn with a chord around the waist, and the daopao worn without chord. The yesa of this period was a type of new garment which only appeared in the Ming dynasty and was likely localized from and developed under the influence of the jisün the Yuan dynasty. The chengziyi was developed in the late Ming and bore some similarities with the yesa. In the same ancient text, Wang Shizhen also noted that the daopao was also called zhiduo. However, the zhiduo was another kind of paofu which had predated the Yuan dynasty and can be traced back to the Tang dynasty.

Other Chinese sources also indicate that the daopao had been worn since the Song dynasty (960–1279). After the year 960 AD, the belted daopao was worn by the Taoist priests in order to distinguish themselves from others. The broad and elegant robes which were initially worn by Taoist priests were known as the dàofú (道服; 'Taoist clothing'); sometimes translated as "Taoist priest robe").

==== Song dynasty ====
In the Northern Song dynasty, Taoism was highly revered. During this period, the daofu also became very popular and was greatly appreciated by some hermits and scholars during the Song dynasty and was mentioned in some poems written by Wang Yucheng and Fan Zhongyan. Some scholars, such Shi Manqing (994 –1041), who was a celebrated scholar in the Northern Song dynasty, would often wore a daofu with a scarf worn in a free style. The Shi Manqin-style daofu was liked by some officials who were in their retirement; and therefore, they dressed in this form of daofu.

In the Southern Song dynasty, it was Neo-Confucianism which arose and flourished; a new form of daofu became fashionable; this form of daofu was the garment worn by the scholars which followed the Daoxue (道學) Confucianism. In the book Rules of Moral Teaching study by Zhu Xi, Zhu Xi stressed on the importance of dress code as being the first step for a person to be a "decent person". Since Zhu Xi put so much emphasis on the dress code, the literati eventually gradually developed their own dressing style as an accepted custom, which included the daofu which was worn as a form of leisure clothing. Contemporary observers living in the Southern Song dynasty, such as Shi Shengzu (1192－1274), also noted that the return of the classic-style apparel in the Song dynasty had made the daofu popular. In Volume 2 of the chapter Xuezhai zhanbi (学斋占毕) in the Yinshi yifu jinjiebiangu (飲食衣服今皆變古), Shi Shengzu reported that the daofu had been made popular by the use of guan and the shoes called lü; he associated the reason behind the popularity of daofu with the attire style of the Taoist priests, which he observed, had remained unchanged for centuries. He also concluded that the apparel system of the three ancient Chinese dynasties, referred collectively as the Sandai (三代), could still be found among the attire-style of the Taoist priests.

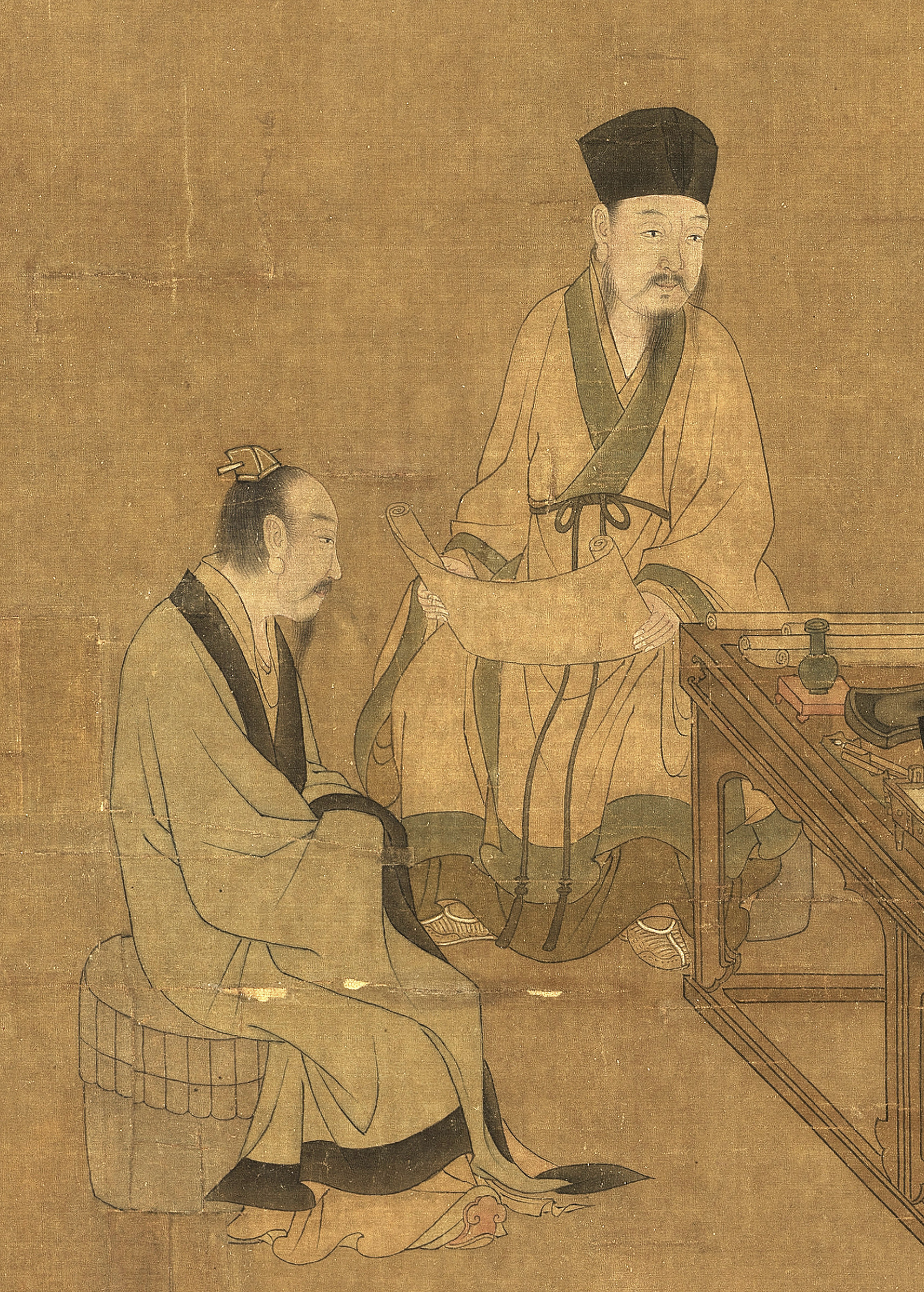
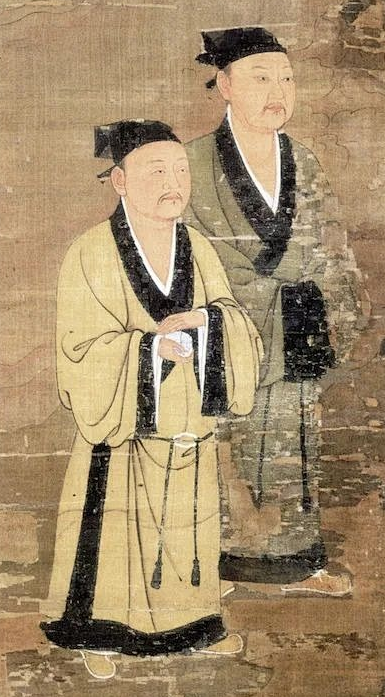
Men wearing zhiduo or daopao, from paintings of the Southern Song dynasty.

==== Ming dynasty ====
During the Ming dynasty, the traditional clothing system of the Han Chinese, the Hanfu, was restored following the fall of the Mongol-led Yuan dynasty. The daofu and the daopao continued to be worn in the Ming dynasty; the daopao was similar to the daofu in the Ming dynasty, with the presence of decorative border trims on the daofu as an exception. However, despite the restoration of the Hanfu-system by the Ming dynasty court, the shape of some garment, including the daopao, had some differences from the ones worn in the Tang and Song dynasties as the clothing in the Ming dynasty had undergone a series of adjustments to their shapes. The shape of the Ming dynasty daopao, and its colours, was strictly regulated by the political systems, rules and regulations of the time.

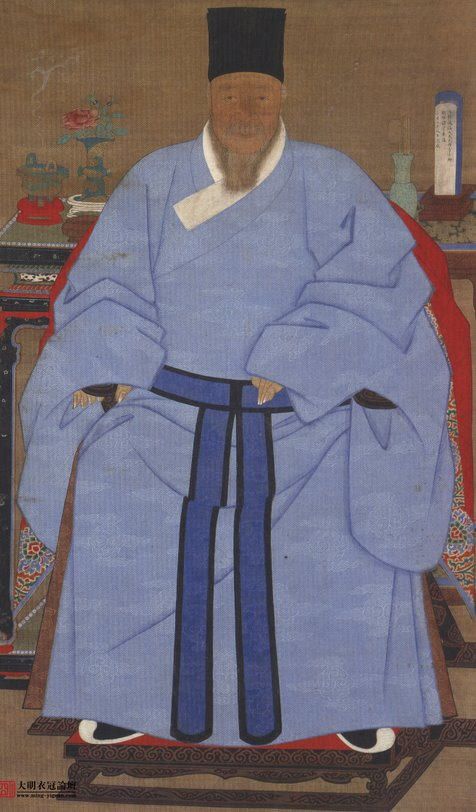
A man wearing daopao with dadai-belt.

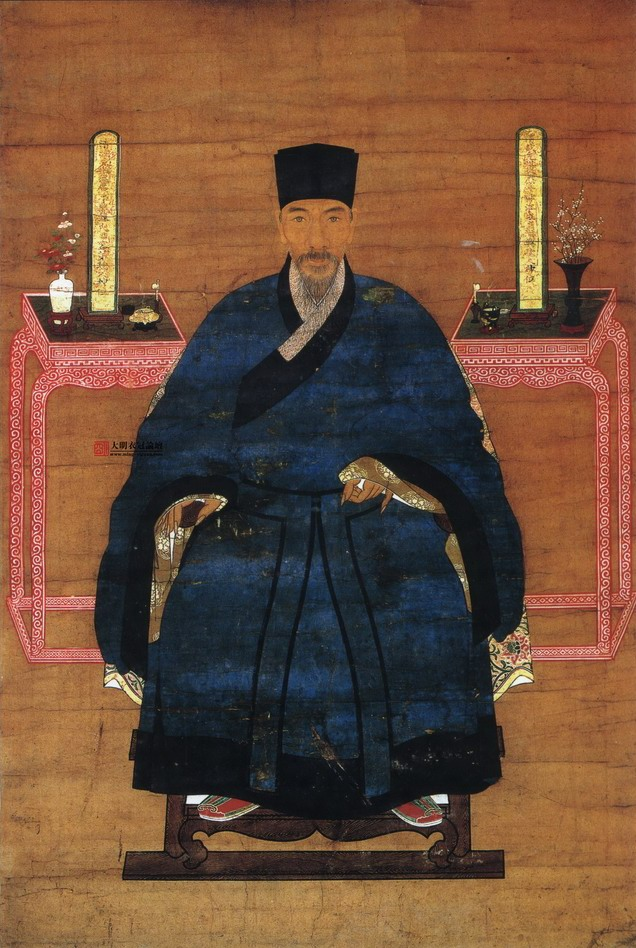
Man wearing daofu with dadai-belt.

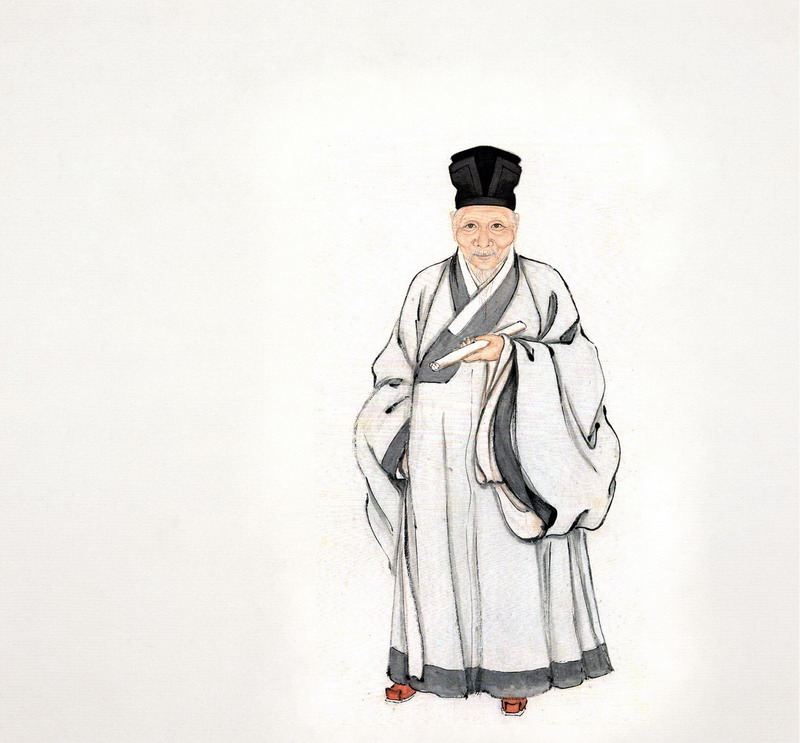
Xu Yueshan wearing daopao, without a belt.

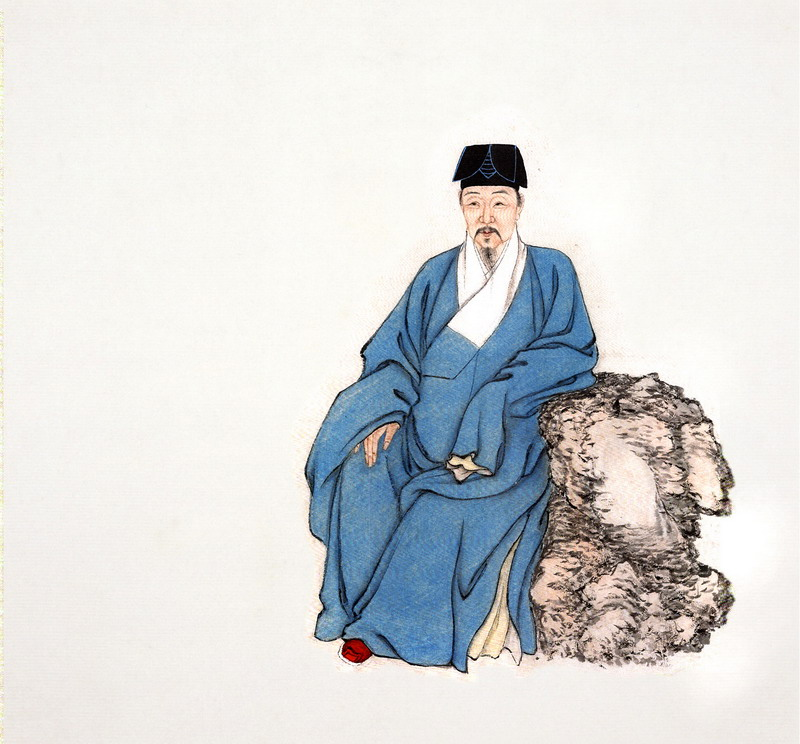
Yang Yusun wearing daopao, without a belt.

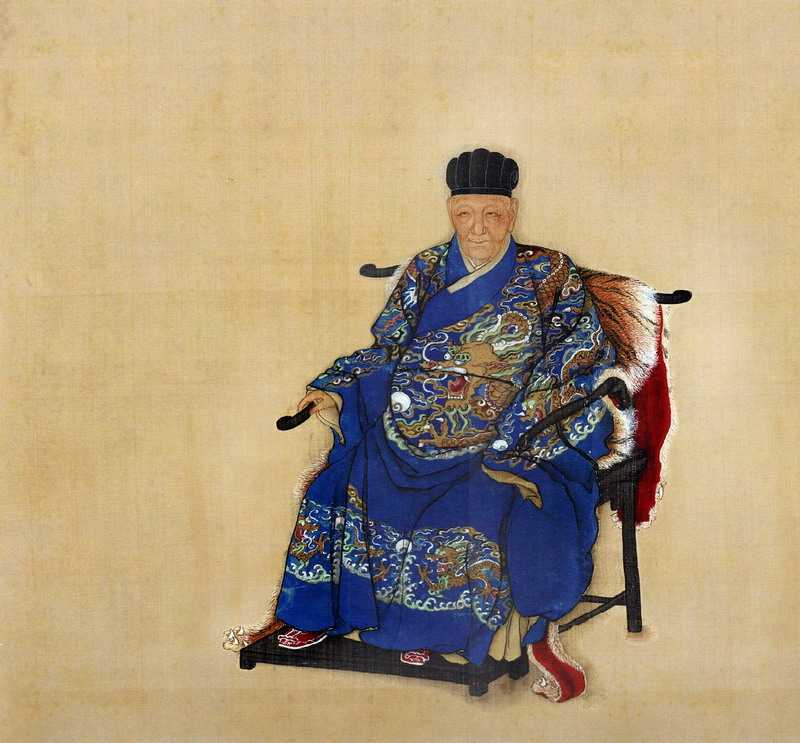
Lu Shusheng wearing daopao with dragon patterns.

=== Construction and design ===
==== Ming dynasty daopao ====
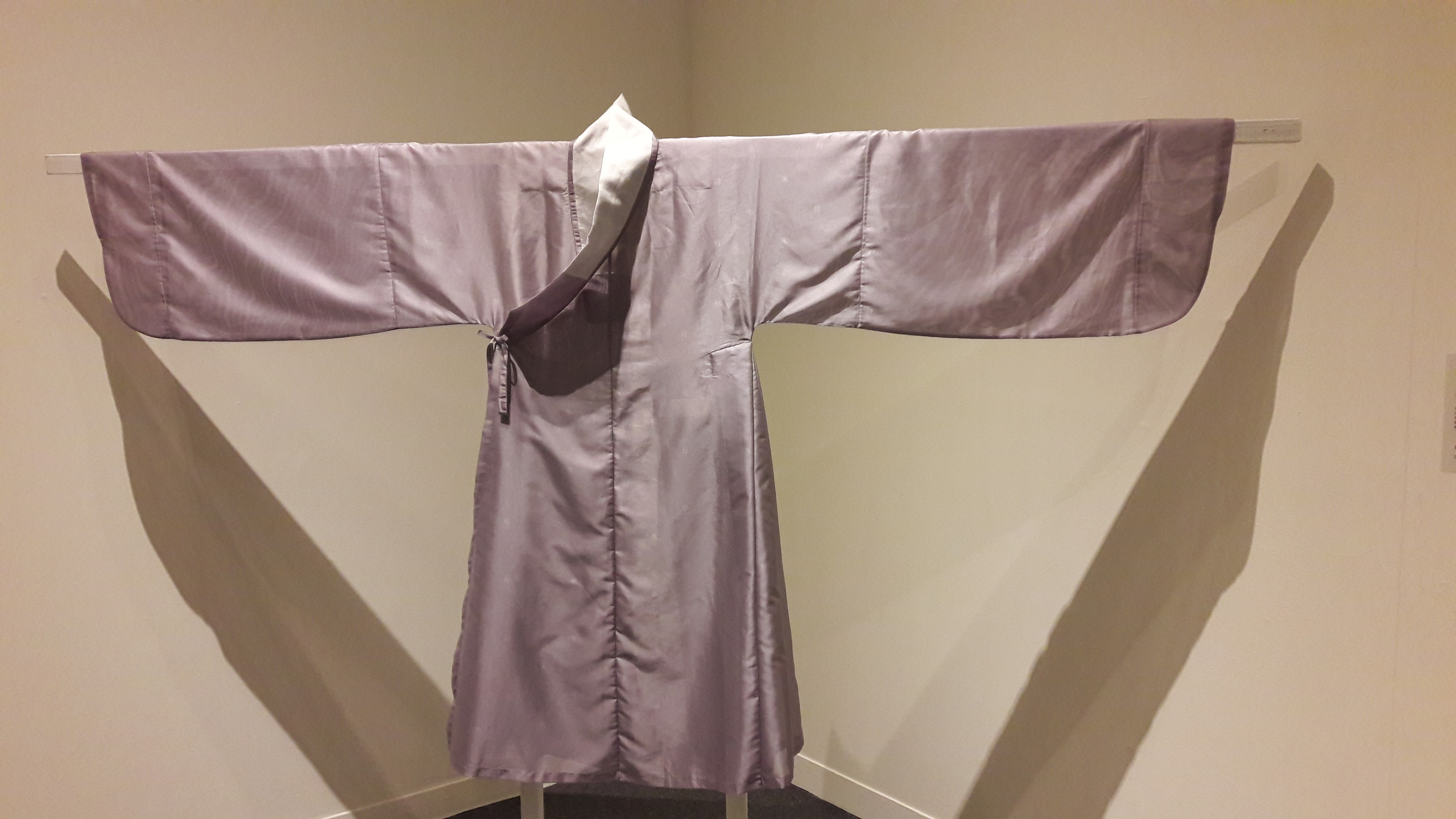
Ming dynasty-style daopao

The Ming dynasty daopao is a full-length. It has a large frontal outer placket and smaller frontal inner placket. There is a pair of ties at the small placket and two pairs of ties on the large placket which is used for closing the garment. The sleeves are large but are narrower around the wrists. It characterized by a cross collar, which closes at the right side in the front, in a style called jiaoling youren.

Differences between daopao and shenyi.

It is also not completely stitched at the two sides and allows for side slits to begin below the waist level. At the sides of the robes, there are side panels in the form of concealed swing or pendulum structure (i.e. a front and back swings at each sides of the robe). These side panels at these slits, are called ànbǎi (暗擺), and they were designed to conceal undergarments.

Illustration of the dadai.

The neckline of the robe is often decorated with white or plain collars. The collar can be either the same or a different colour to the main pieces of fabric. However, the collar is generally the same colour as the hems. An optional additional protective collar called hù lǐng (护领; 護領; 'protective collar') could also be sewn to the first collar. The huling either be white or dark in colour.

A belt called dàdài (大带; 大帶; 'large belt') was also fastened around the waist. In total, the structure of the Ming dynasty daopao was made up of 10 parts.

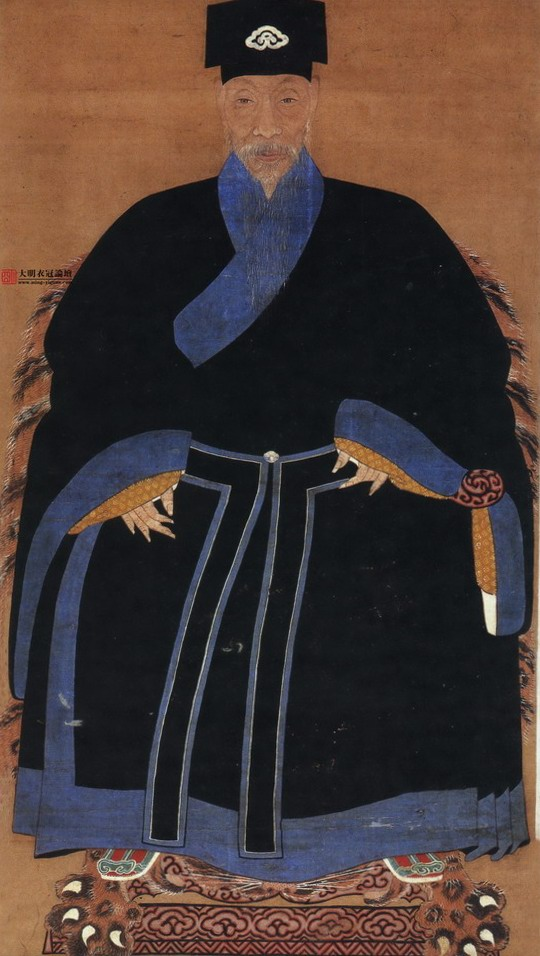
A man wearing a daofu with a dadai belt worn around the waist; it is edged with light blue decorative trims, Ming dynasty portrait.

==== Ming dynasty daofu ====
In the Ming dynasty, the daofu was a wide-sleeved, crossed-collar robe which closes to the right in a style called jiaoling youren; it also had dark edging at the edges of the collar, sleeves, and placket. In the collar edge, the huling was sometimes inserted. The Ming dynasty daofu was similar to the daopao, except for the addition of edges decoration on the robe. Belts, like the dadai (大带; 大帶) and the sītāo (丝绦; 絲絛; 'silk waistband'; "a ribbon or a thin rope made of silk") was also used around the waist when wearing the daofu.

== Derivatives and influences ==
=== China ===
==== Xuezi ====
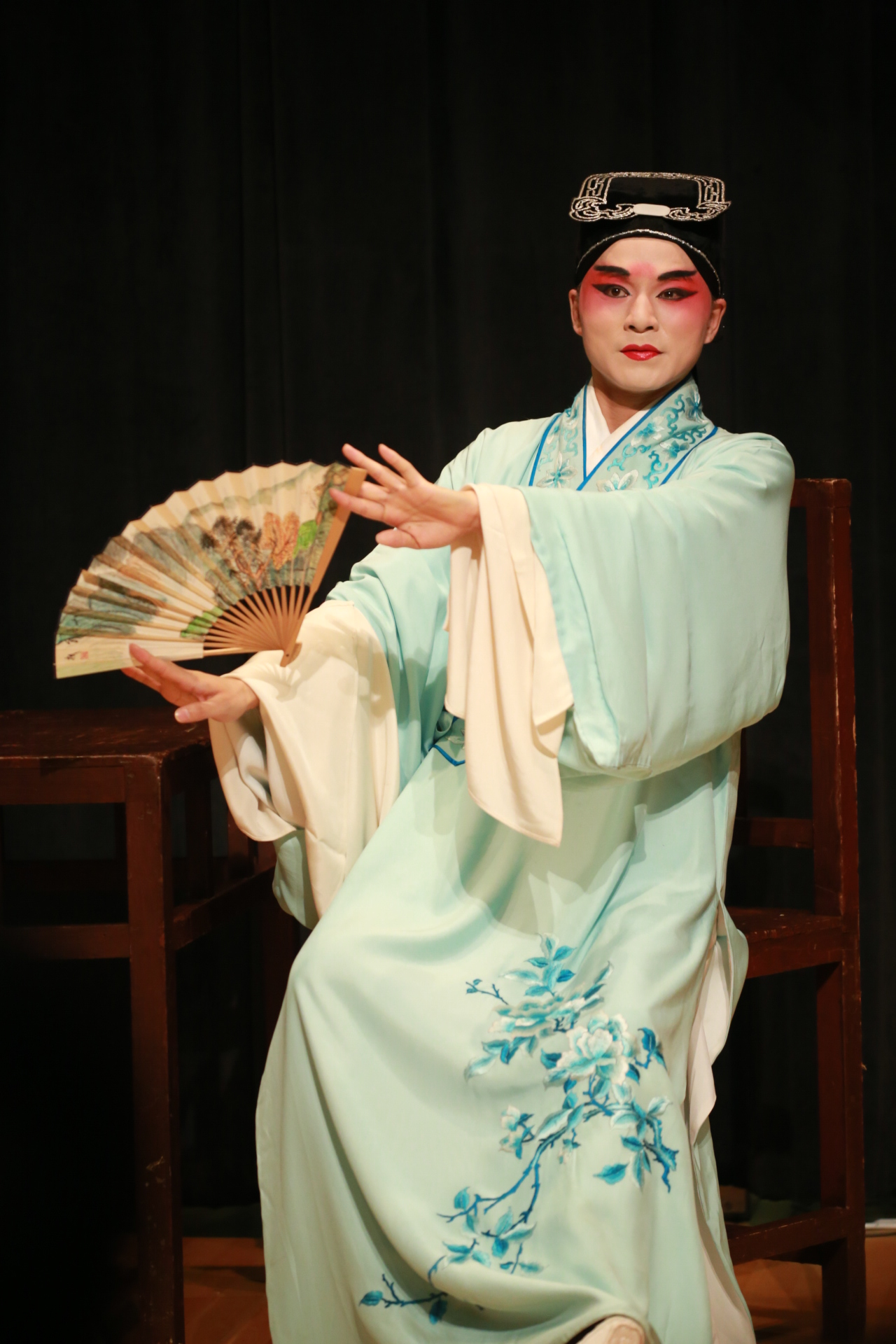
A man performing as a xiaosheng in xuezi, Kunqu

The xuezi (褶子) which is a costume in Xifu, is a derivative of the Ming dynasty daopao which was worn by the Ming dynasty scholars as an every day formal attire.It is also a derivative of the jiaolingpao which dates back from the Zhou dynasty.

In the Qing dynasty, actors who performed in Chinese opera performance were allowed to wear Hanfu and Hanfu-style Xifu as they were exempted from the Tifayifu policy. Therefore, the xuezi was therefore allowed to be worn and continues to be worn even in present days, where it is now one of the most common form of costumes worn on stage.

When used in Chinese opera, the xuezi is a form of informal dress worn by performers who hold the sheng role types, which include the xiaosheng and the wenxiaosheng. Performers playing female roles could also wear a xuezi called nüxuezi, which was also used as an informal robe.

===== Construction and design =====
The xuezi is structurally different from the jiaolingpao: the xuezi has a trapezoid body, narrower sleeves which is tubular in shape, the sleeves are longer than the wrists, and water sleeves are also added; there is an asymmetrical closure where the right side is right below the shoulder and neck intersection while the left crossing over is tied right under the right arm in a style called jiaoling youren. There are also differences in the shapes and forms of the xuezi depending on the role types:

Actors performing the role of men wear a full-length xuezi while actors performing the role of women wear a knee-length xuezi; the male xuezi has a jiaoling youren closure while there are two types of closure for the nüxuezi, one which has a jiaoling youren closure and one which has front central closure, a style which can be referred as duijin.

The wenxiaosheng often wears xuezi of pastel colours, which is embroidered with flowers and has water sleeves.

=== Korea ===
The daopao was imported from the Ming dynasty to Korea during the Joseon period, where it became known as dopo and was eventually localized in Korea gaining its current form. In this period, the intellectual current which had been popularized in Joseon was the Zhuzi studies (viz. 程朱理學: 程子理學 and 朱子理學) which was of Chinese origins. According to the Joseon literati, Sŏng Tae-chung, who visited Japan in the 1764 at a time when the Ming dynasty had already fallen, when asked what he wore as a robe and headwear by Ryūzan, Sŏng Tae-chung answered that he was wearing the dopo and the bokgeon which were the attire of the ancient sages; the dopo and bokgeon were both Confucian attire and dressing style which had been adopted in Joseon.

== Daojiao Fushi ==
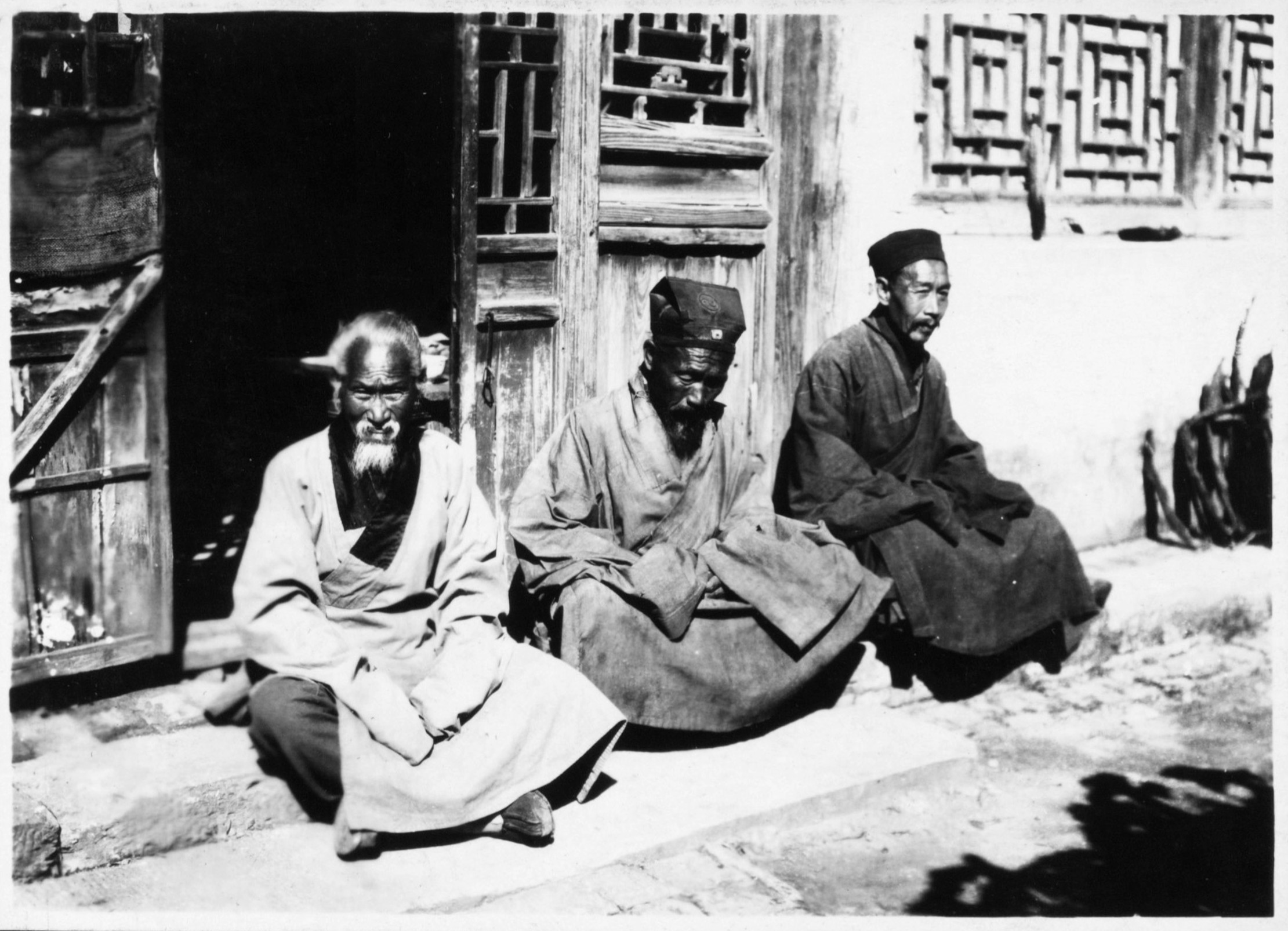
Three Taoist priests at White Cloud Temple, Beijing, 1931.

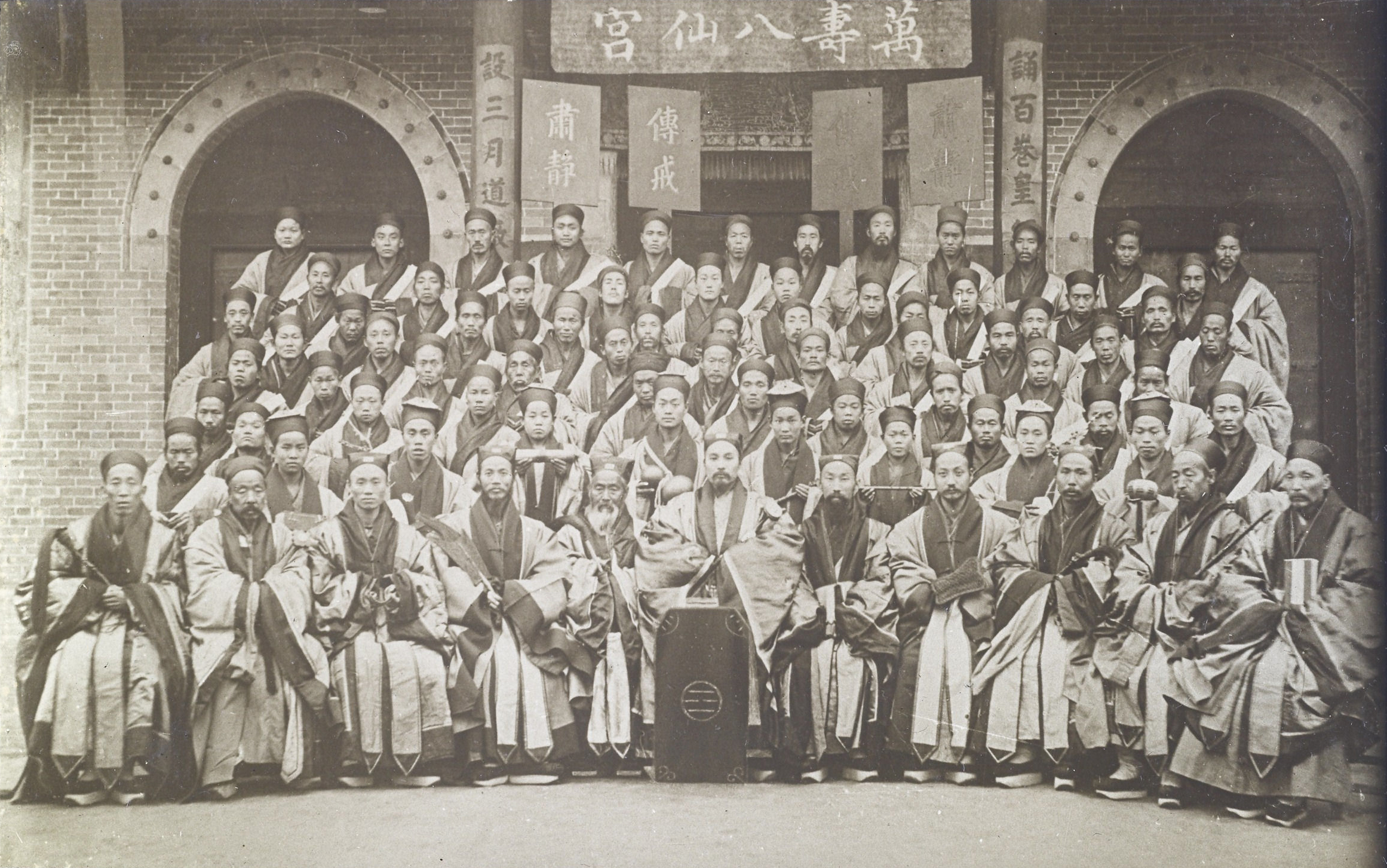
Taoist clergy wearing the daopao and hechang of Baxian Temple, Xi'an, 1910-1911.

The traditional clothing worn by the Taoist community is connected to pre-modern Chinese clothing and styles. Tradition-based taoists will often wear the traditional robes and liturgical clothing for formal religious and ritual occasions while Zhengyi priests and taoists priests outside mainland China tend to wear Western clothing in their daily lives. The traditional taoist robes can also be worn as a daily lives clothing by the Quanzhen monastics in mainland China. There were many forms of daojiao fushi in the ancient China.

=== Daopao/ hechang ===
Some forms of taoist robes are also referred as crane robes (鶴氅; hechang). The Taoist priests' daopao which date back to at least the 1800s is not cross collared and instead looks like a beizi in terms of construction and design; a clothing artefact showing this style of daopao is now stored in museums such as the Rhode Island School of Design Museum. The Taoist's priest daopao are commonly worn by the Taoism priests. It is worn by middle-ranks Taoist priests; it is red in colour and has motifs at the back and front, on the sleeves. Theses motifs decorations can include, the bagua and cranes.

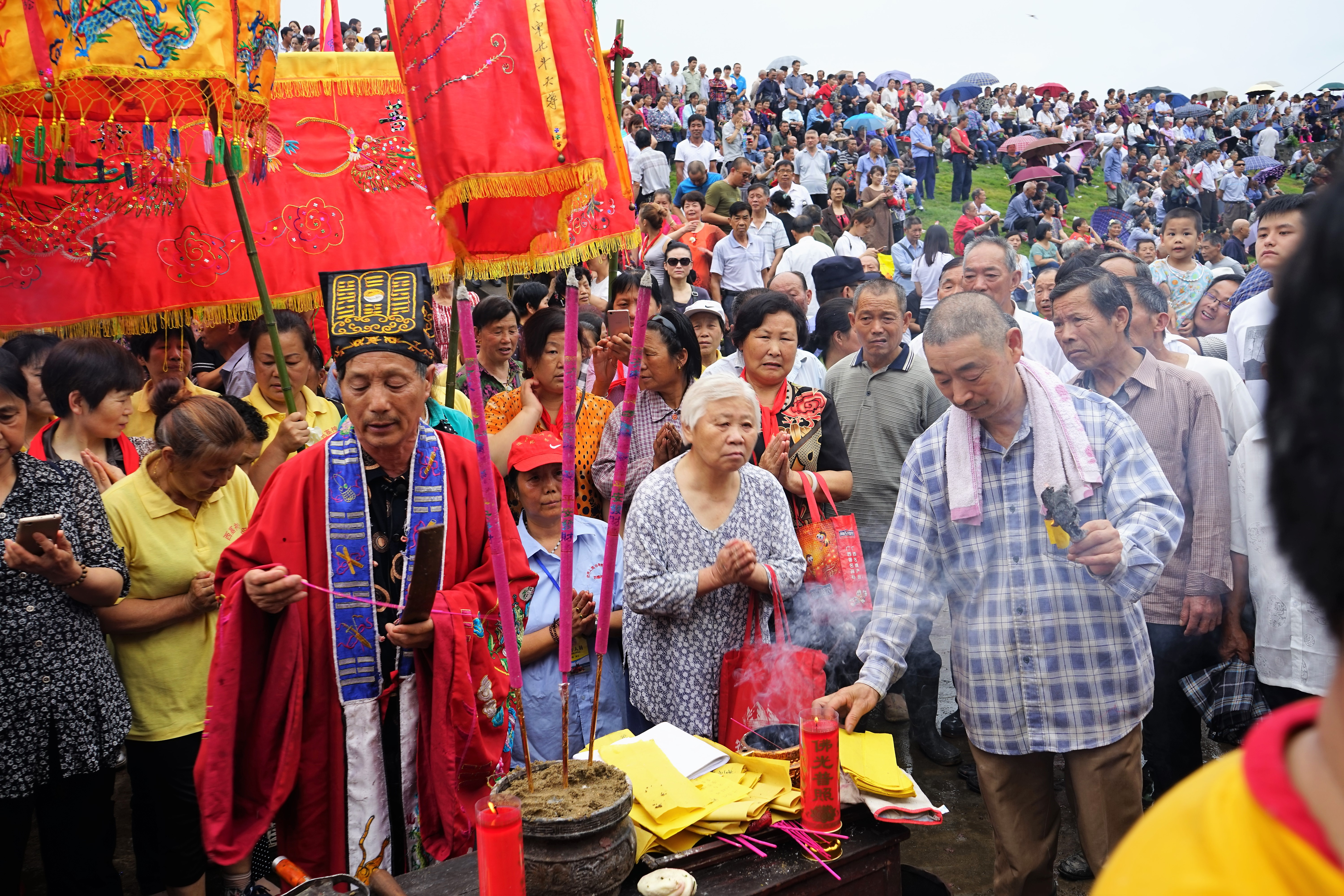
A taoist priest wearing a modern-day taoist's daopao (depicted as a red overcoat), 2017.

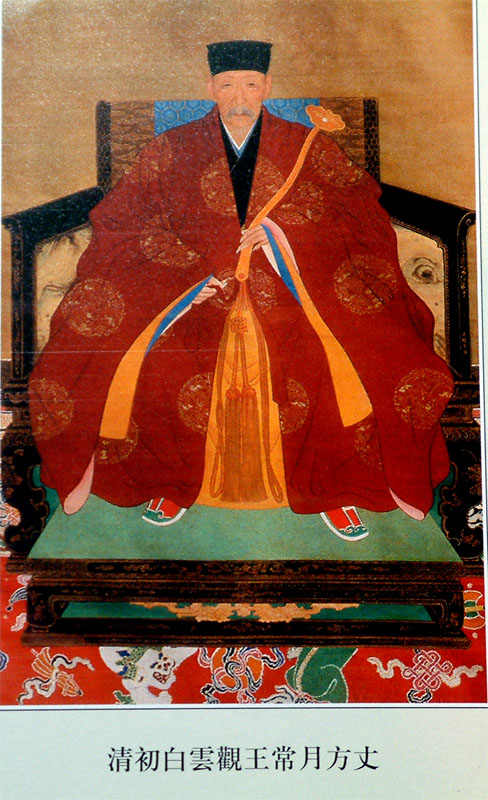
Wang Changyue, Qing dynasty.

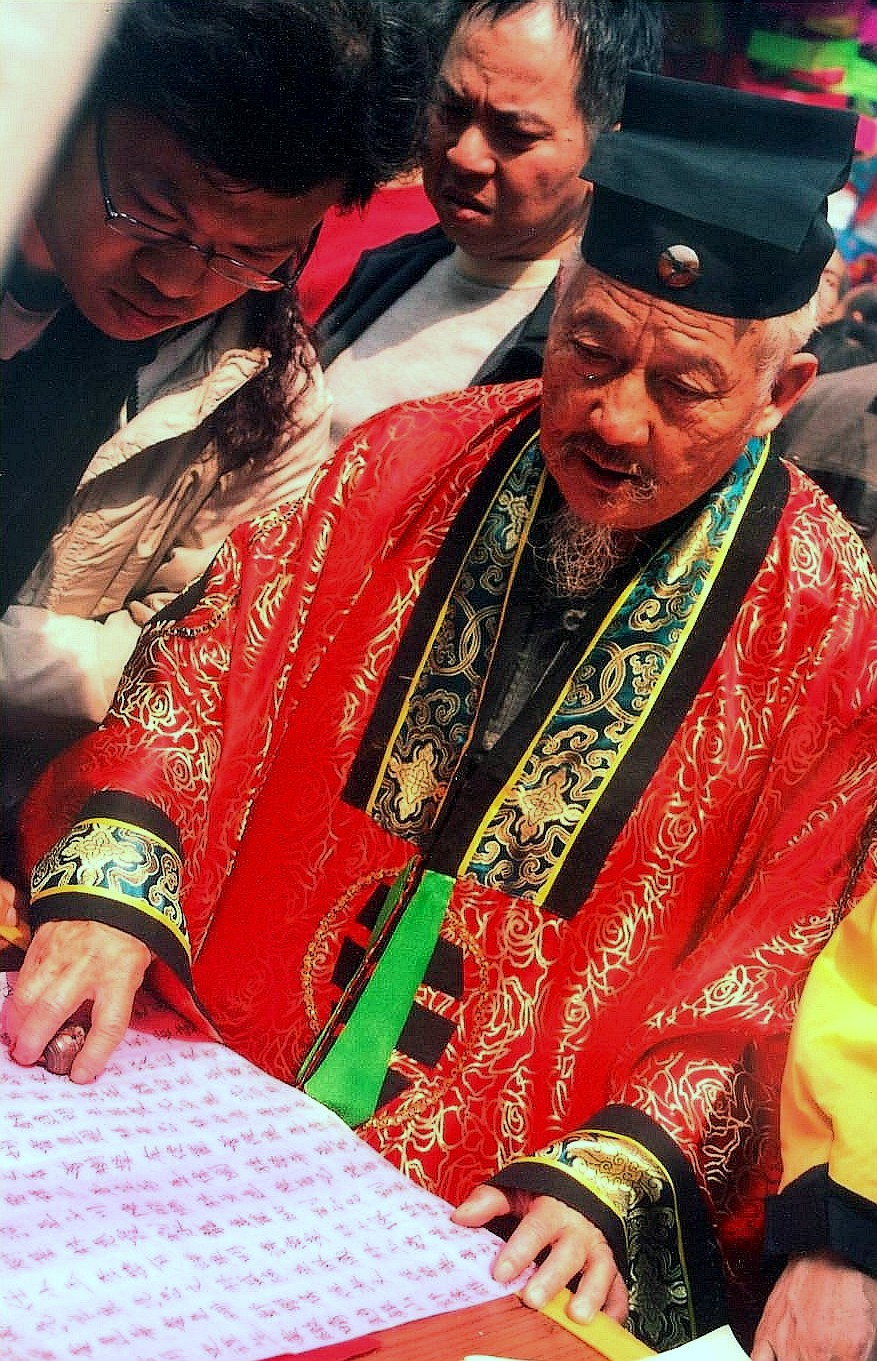
Taoist Priest in Macau, 2006.

=== Jiangyi ===
Jiàngyī (絳衣), also known as "robe of descent" which refers to either the descent of a priest from the altar or of the spirits to the altar, is a common form of Taoist priest's clothing. The jiangyi is a sign of the higher priestly rank and is worn by grandmasters. It was worn at least since the Ming and Qing dynasties.

It looks similar to a poncho in structure; when worn, the robe sits squarely on the shoulders of the Taoist' priest; it is usually fastened across the front with two silk ties which are sewn just above the waist level. It is made of embroidered silks and is composed of a large square of satin fabric folded into two to form the shoulder line; the shoulder lines continues to the hem of the sleeves. The robe is slashed in the middle to form the collar of the robe. It is typically trimmed with border decorations.

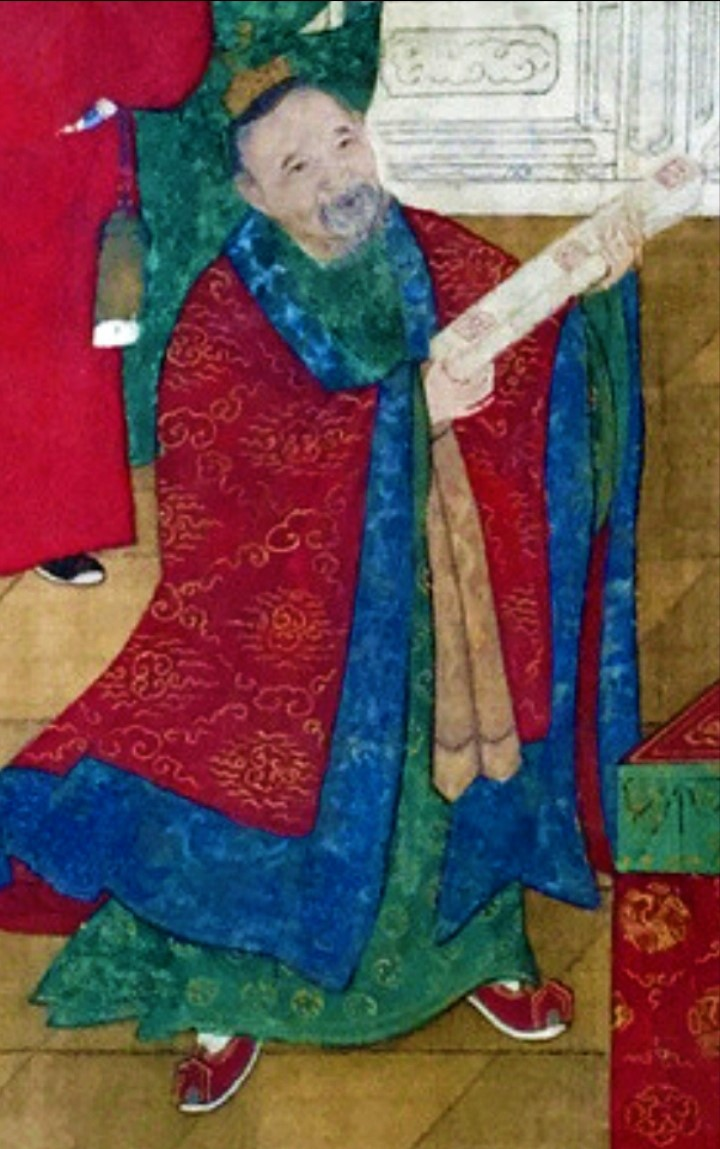
Zhengyi taoist priest wearing jiangyi, Ming dynasty.

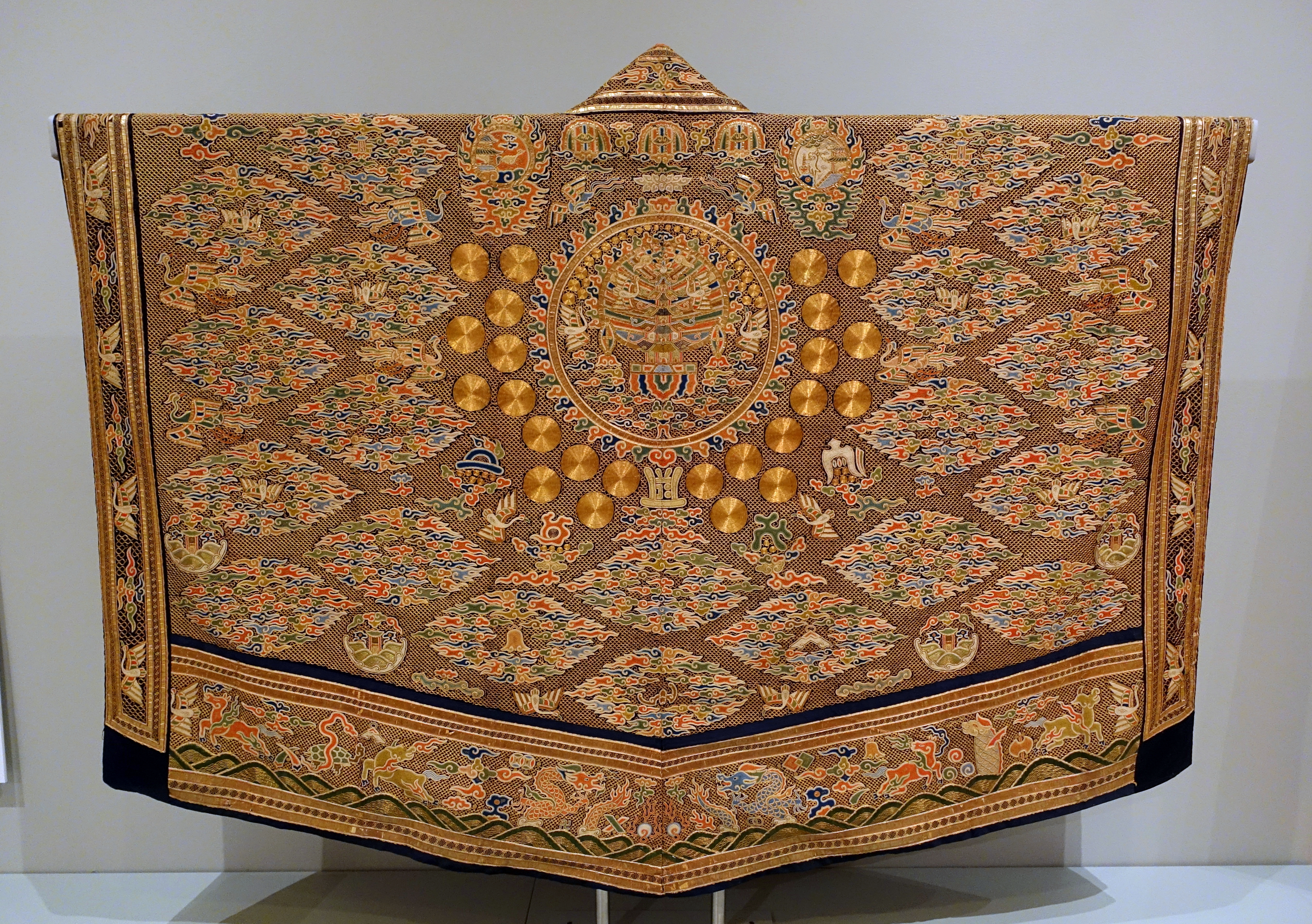
Daoist priest's robe (jiangyi), China, Qing dynasty, late 18th to early 19th century AD/

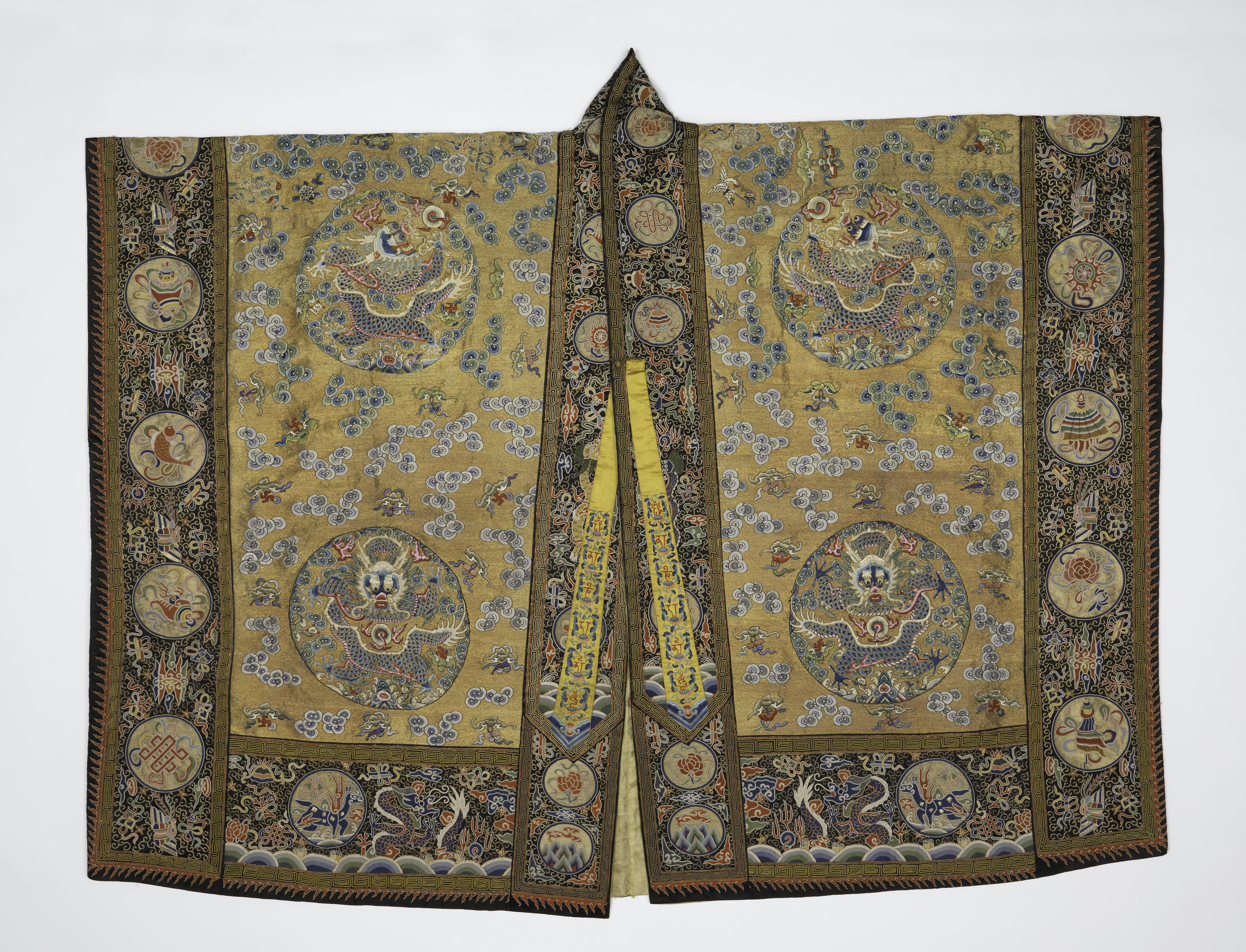
Daoist Priest's Robe (jiangyi), 19th century

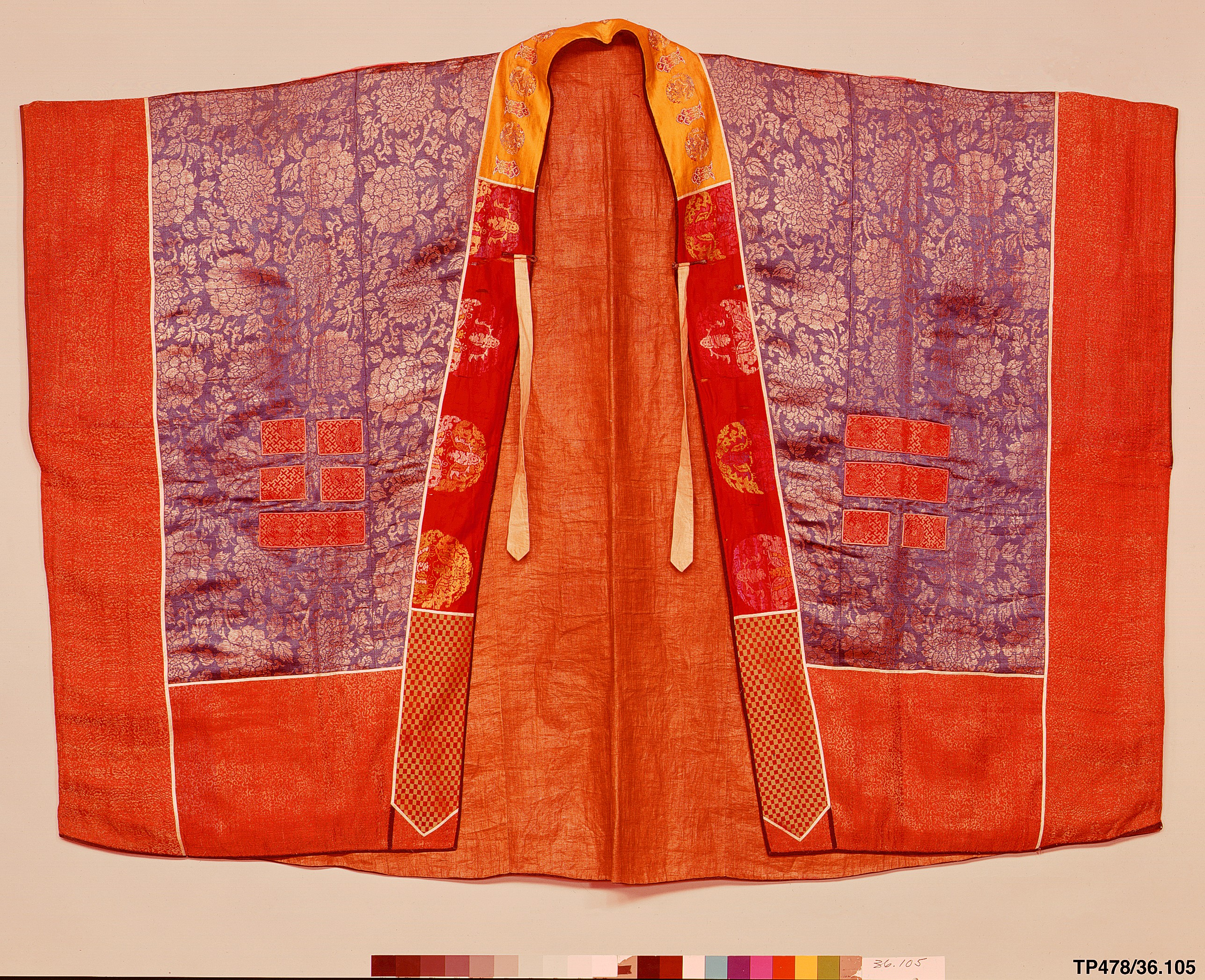
Daoist Priest's Robe (jiangyi), late 18th–early 19th century

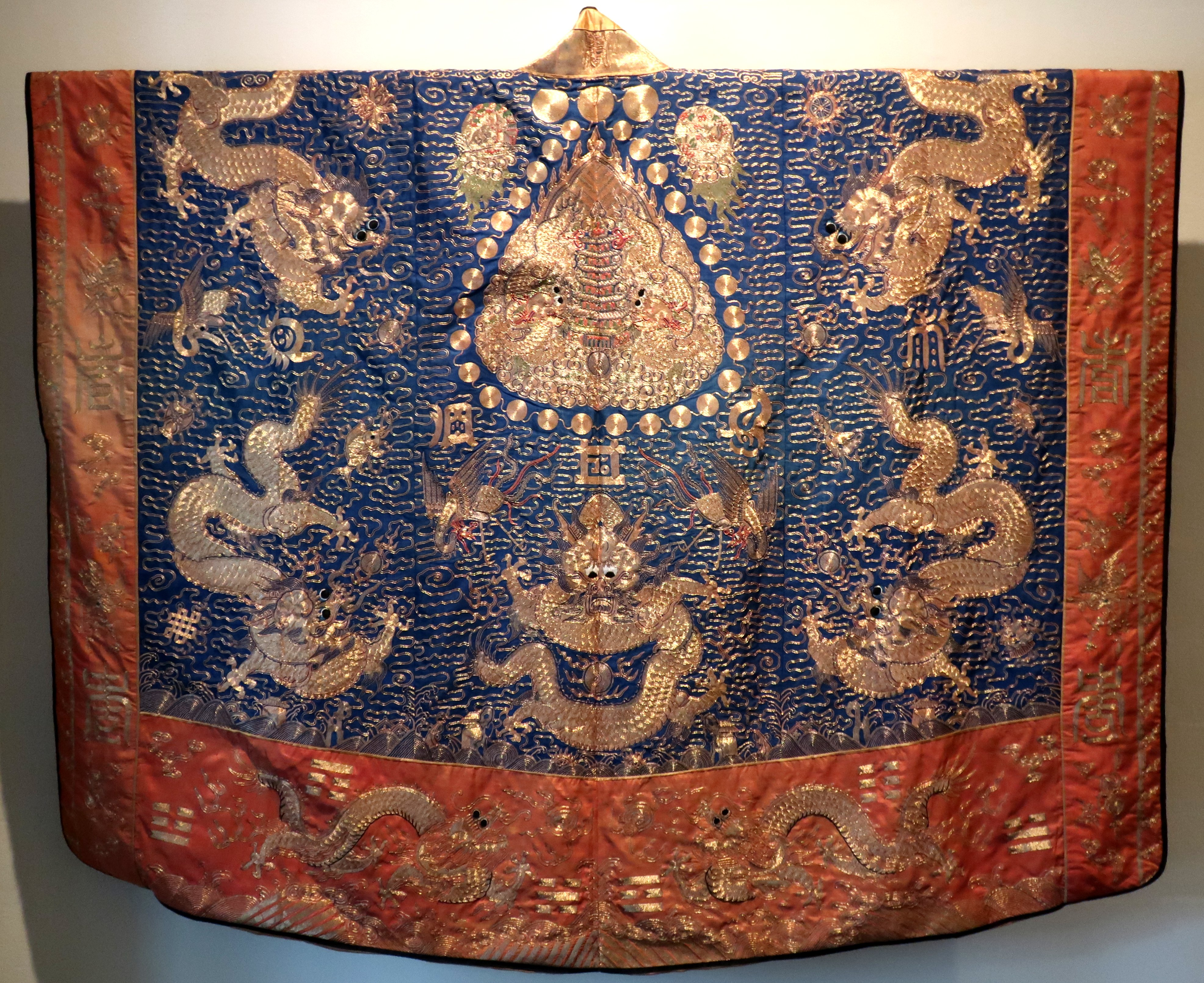
Daoist priest's robe (jiangyi), China, 20th century.

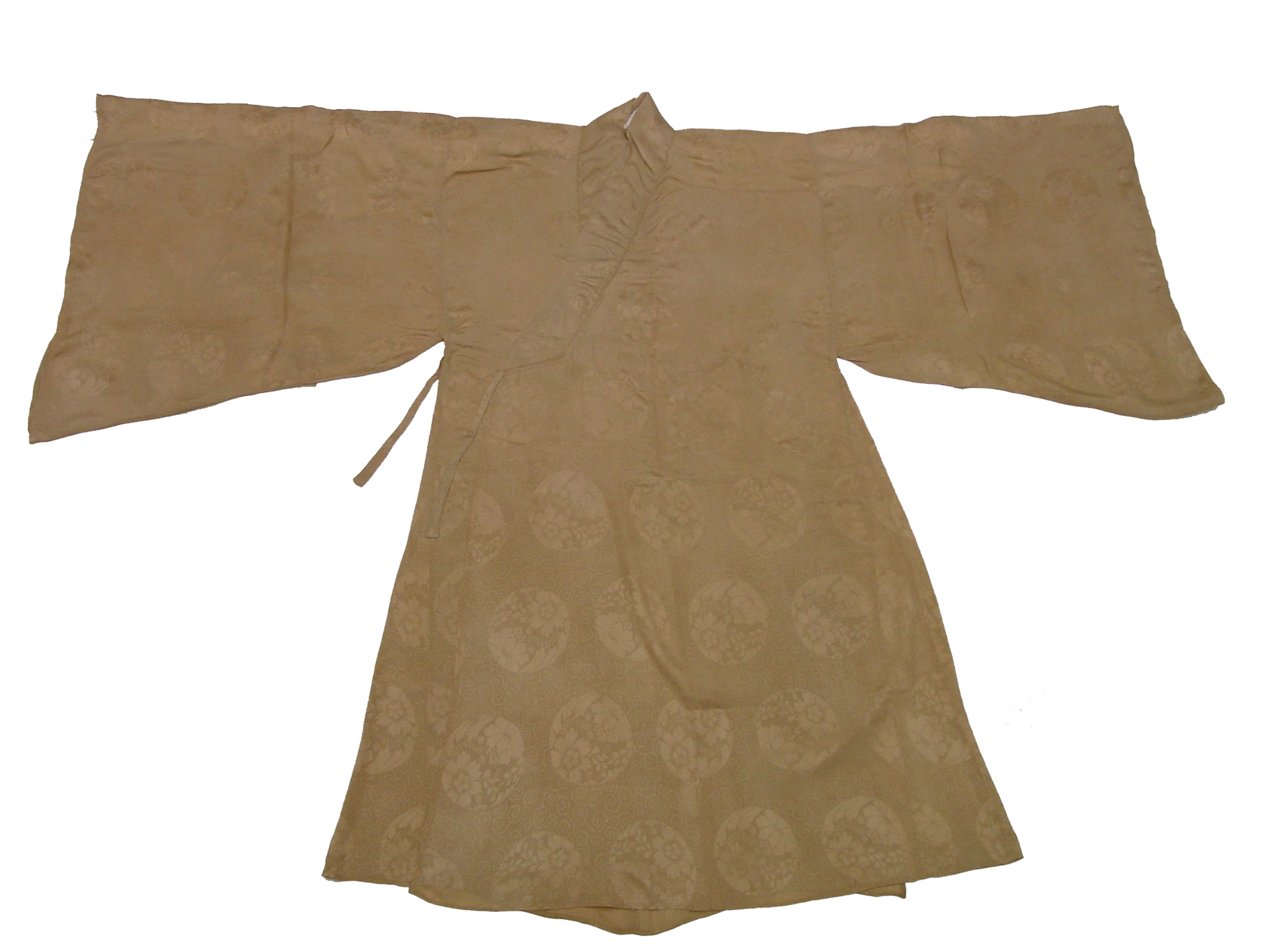
A priest's robe, China, 20th century

Illustration of a man wearing daoyi (道衣) from Gujin Tushu Jicheng, between 1700 and 1725.

=== Daoyi ===
The Quanzhen monastic taoist priests and nuns wear a wide-sleeved, cross-collared gown called daoyi (道衣; 'robe of the Dao') which closes to the right; it is a standard type of clothing. The sleeves of the daoyi is referred as "cloud sleeves"; they are wide, open at the ends, and their sleeves are so long that it is past the fingers when extended but can be even longer. In the Quanzhen order, the dagua is worn as one of the ordinary clothing while the deluo is a formal clothing.

=== Deluo ===
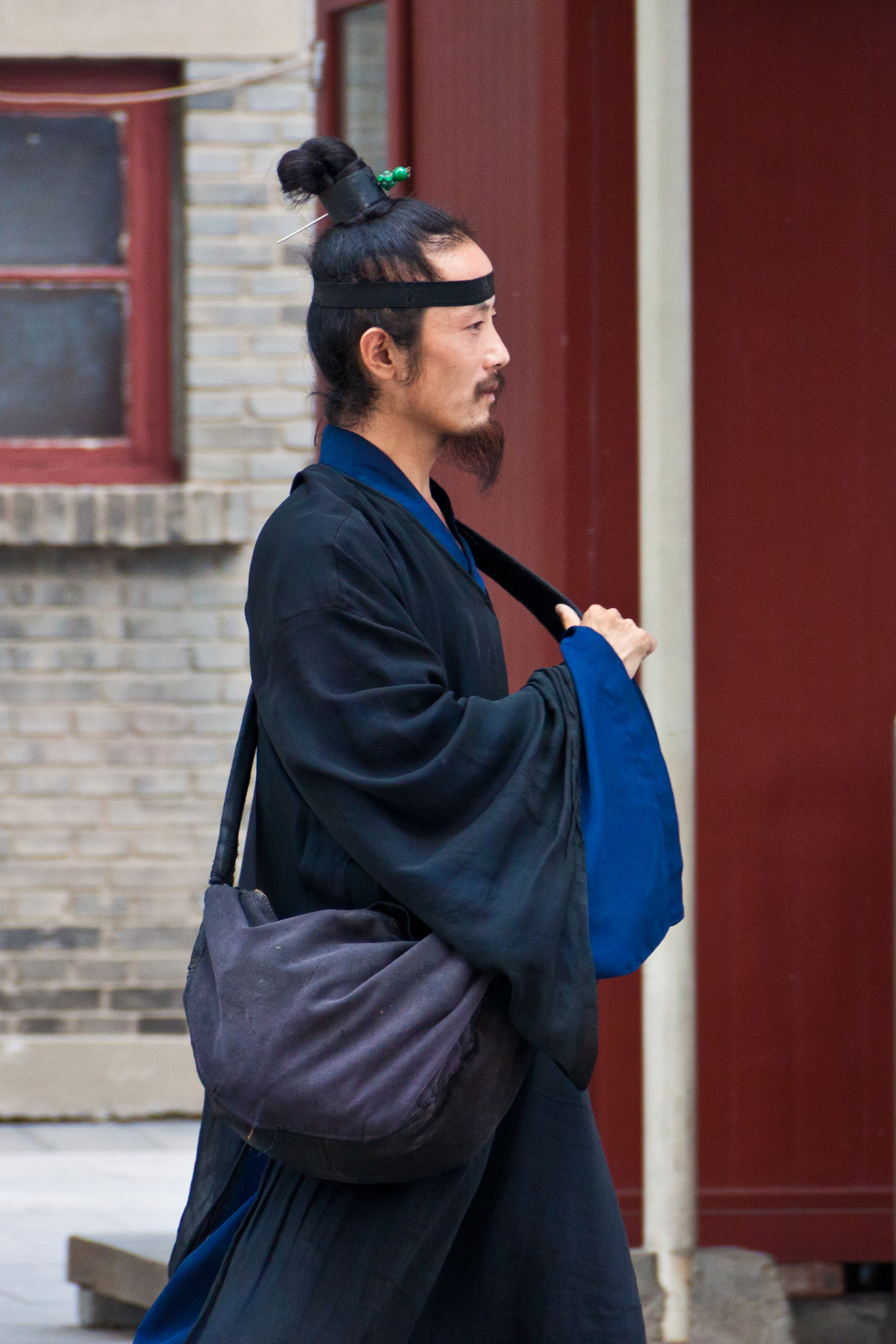
A modern-day Taoist.

The deluo (得罗) is a cross-collared gown with large sleeves. It is worn by Taoist priests of the Quanzhen order is a formal ritual dress which is indigo in colour. The blue colour is a symbolism for the east and represents having been descended from the first patriarch of the Quanzhen school, Donghua dijun. In large temples (e.g. Baiyunguan in Beijing), the deluo would be worn by monastics on festival days; the deluo would have wide sleeves which could reach 45 cm.

=== Daogua ===
In the Wengong temple in Hanzhong, the cross-collar daopao is the standard form of attire and is referred to as daogua (道褂; 'Taoist robe', 'Taoist jacket'). Their daopao is cross-collared at the front, and the sleeves are so long that only the fingers can escape from the sleeves. It is made of thick garments and is blue or black in colour. The daogua can be found in 3 types: dagua (大褂; 'great gown'), a long cross-collar robe which reaches the ankles and has a 42 cm wide sleeves; zhonggua (中褂); a cross-collar robe which reaches the mid-calf and has slightly narrower sleeves than the dagua; and xiaogua (小褂), a cross-collar robe which reaches the hip and has sleeves which could either be the same size or narrower than a zhongua; the xiaogua is more similar to a jacket than a robe.

== Similar garments ==
- Sengyi (僧衣) - Long Buddhist abbot robes.
- Hai Qing (海青) - Buddhist ritual garment.
- Zhiduo, also known as zhishen (直身) - a style similar to the daopao except that it was decorated with outside pendulums.
- Dopo (clothing) - A Korean equivalent

== See also ==
- Hanfu
- List of Hanfu
- Paofu
