= Yuan Hongdao =

Chinese poet (1568–1610)

Yuan Hongdao (Chinese: 袁宏道; pinyin: Yuán Hóngdào; Wade–Giles: Yüan Hung-tao, style name Zhonglang, 1568–1610) was a scholar-official and one of the greatest Chinese poets and littérateurs of the Ming Dynasty. He is also a well known author on Pure Land Buddhism.

Yuan Hongdao is one of the Three Yuan Brothers, along with his brothers Yuan Zongdao and Yuan Zhongdao. All were known for their literary writings influenced by Buddhism and Neo-Confucian Yangmingism. In Chinese Buddhism, Yuan is most famous for his Comprehensive Treatise on the West [Pure Land] (Xīfāng hélùn), an influential ten-fascicle work on Pure Land Buddhism.

== Life ==
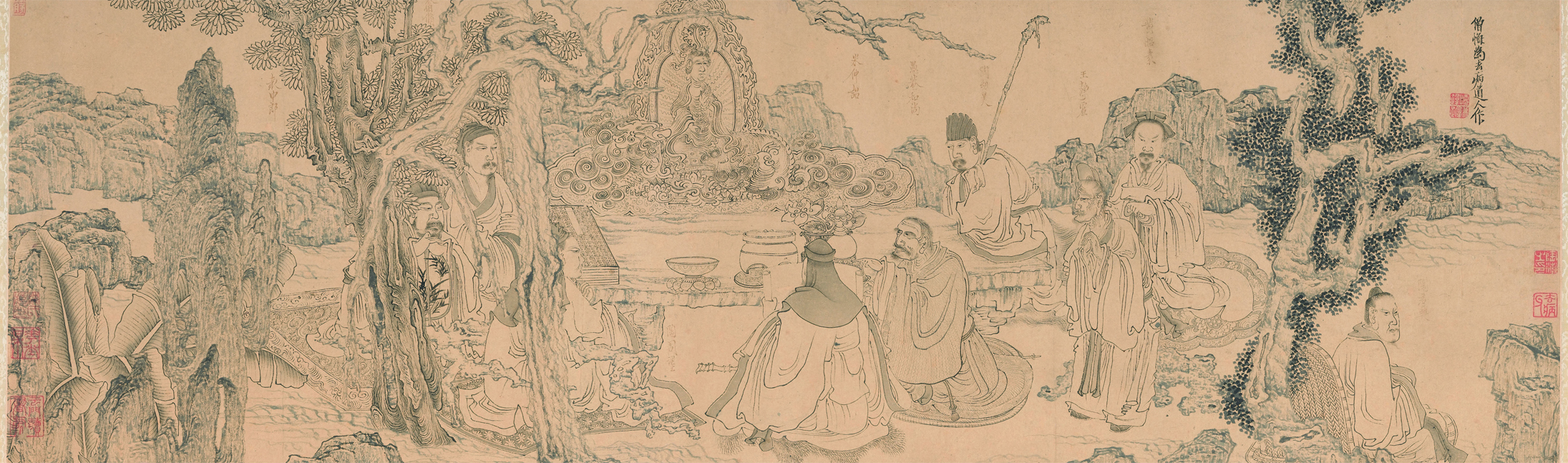
"An Elegant Gathering" by Chen Hongshou. This work depicts the first public presentation of Yuan's Xīfāng hélùn. Yuan Hongdao is depicted on the far left next to a tree.

Hongdao's life spanned nearly the whole of the Wanli period (1573-1620) in Chinese history. A native of Gong'an in Hukuang, his family had been officials for generations. Hongdao showed an interest in literature from youth and formed his own literary club at age fifteen. At an early age, Yuan took the jinshi examination (the highest gentry position in China) and subsequently received the official jinshi position in the government bureaucracy in 1594. During his years in the capital he also developed an interest in Buddhism, influenced by other elite Buddhist laymen of the time, like Jiao Hong. He initially studied the writings of Chan masters like Dahui Zonggao.

During his early years, Yuan also witnessed the death of his cousin Yuan Deng, whom he instructed to recite the Buddha's name at the end. Deng then reported to Yuan that he had a vision of the Buddha as he was dying. This experience left a strong impression on Yuan Hongdao.

Yuan soon became well known in literati circles and famed for his writing, moving in the intellectual circles of the Ming elite. He was close friends with the radical Neo-Confucian (Yangmingist) and Buddhist philosopher Li Zhi 李贄 (1527-1602) who promoted the "Crazy Chan" (Ch.: kuang chan 狂禪) ideal. Li Zhi would be Yuan's main Buddhist mentor for over ten years. Likewise, Yuan studied Buddhist texts extensively together with his two other brothers.

The poetry of the Yuan brothers, which focused on clarity and sincerity, produced a following that eventually came to be known as the Gong'an school of poetry and essay writing. The main tenet of this school of poetry was that good writing was a result of genuine emotions and personal experience. Yuan Hongdao was also known as a leading author of the "short essay" (xiaopin wen).

In 1597, Yuan had already grown tired of working as a government magistrate and so he resigned. Afterwards he spent his time traveling, reading, and meeting with friends to write and discuss philosophy. During this retired period he spent some time with the eminent monk Yunqi Zhuhong at Yunqifa temple, later known as a patriarch of Pure Land Buddhism. Zhuhong clearly had an influence on Yuan, since he wrote in praise of him and his later Pure Land writing shows that Yuan studied Zhuhong's writings.

In 1598 he returned to Beijing and became a teacher at the imperial academy. He also started a literary society he called Grape Society. With more time for writing, he composed a work on the Zhuangzi. Yuan also wrote a treatise on Pure Land Buddhism which made its way into the Chinese Buddhist canon. This is the Xīfāng hélùn 西方合論 (Comprehensive treatise on [Pure Land of] the west, Taisho no. 1976). This systematic treatise on Pure Land Buddhism is actually the longest surviving text written by Yuan Hongdao. In spite of this, most scholars have ignored it, focusing mostly on Yuan's secular literature. In this work, Yuan breaks with the radical antinomian Chan of his teacher Li Zhi, advocating for a kind of Buddhism which affirms the importance of moral and religious cultivation.

Yuan continues to serve as a magistrate in the capital for some time. He remained active as a writer and literary critic, and is regarded as one of the prolific literary figures of the period.

== Works ==
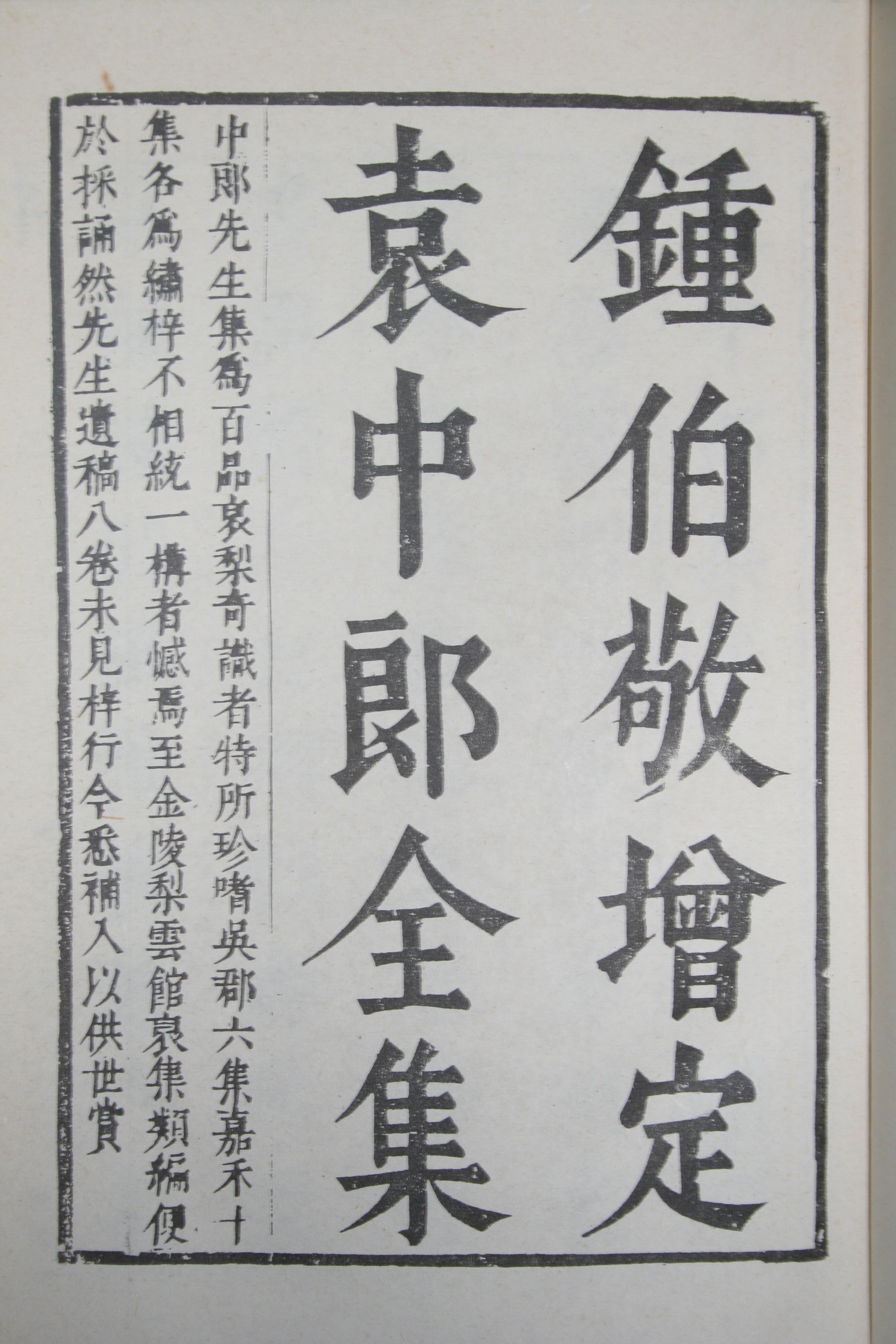
Title page of Yuan's Collected Works, 1629.

Yuan's Collected Works include essays on Buddhism, Confucianism and Daoism, along with poems, short essays (xiao pin wen), travelogues, prefaces, memorials, Buddhist commentaries, many letters, and works on civil examinations.

Yuan's Comprehensive Treatise on the West [Pure Land] (Xīfāng hélùn 西方合論) is his most extensive work, and what he is most well known for today in Chinese Buddhism.

Yuan also published works on many other topics, especially Chan/Zen Buddhism. In, 1603, he published the Zongjing shelu, an anthology of key selections from Yongming Yanshou's Zongjing Lu. He also published an excerpted and highly edited and modified Platform Sutra.

Yuan and his brother Yuan Zhongdao also published a collection of learned conversations on Buddhist (Chan, Pure land, Huayan), Yangmingist and Daoist topics, entitled The Coral Grove (Shanhu Lin 珊瑚林).

Regarding his poetry, it is found in various compilations including Collection from the Studio of Vase Flowers (Pinghua zhai ji 瓶花齋集), Collection from the Verdant Hall (Xiaobi tang ji 瀟碧堂集), and Collection of Liberation (Jietuo ji 解脫集).

== Pure Land thought ==
Yuan's Xīfāng hélùn (Comprehensive Treatise on the West) presents a comprehensive Pure Land Buddhist philosophy in ten fascicles (juan). The work answers numerous questions and critiques of Pure Land Buddhism with rational arguments and scriptural citations.

The Xīfāng hélùn also criticizes radical Chan antinomianism popular at the time. Some Chan Buddhists at the time held that there was no need to adhere to Buddhist ethical principles if one was awakened. Some Chan teachers also rejected the pure land impulse to be born in a pure land (Sukhavati) outside this world system. Yuan's work defends the importance of vegetarianism and keeping the Buddhist precepts. It also attempts to show that Pure Land Buddhism was intellectually respectable and philosophically profound, against the claims that it was only suitable for uneducated peasants or people who cling to dualism and cannot understand the deeper teachings of Buddhism. Yuan himself writes that the main reason he wrote the work was to counter the influence of "Crazy Chan" which overemphasized emptiness and rejected all other tradition Buddhist practices like nianfo and keeping precepts as a kind of grasping. According to Yuan, an overemphasis on negation had led to a problematic nihilistic state of Chan:

Those who are attached to the attributes of phenomena and the mind are all victims of conditioned processes. Those who cling to emptiness to refute existence are victims of nihilism. [...] Since the five successors of Bodhidharma, the transmission from the sixth patriarch of the Chan school has flourished up to the present, to the point where the thought of the Chan school is now misused. The principle of Consciousness-Only is erroneously interpreted and identified with the "non-action" of non-Buddhist doctrines. Words of attachment are found everywhere.

According to Yuan, these Chan teachings on non-grasping and the provisional nature of Buddhist practice is like water, which can put out a fire. When used too much, it can cause a flood. As such, Yuan wanted to bring some balance back to Buddhism by emphasizing the conventional truths of classic Buddhist practices. In this, Yuan was influenced by earlier figures like Zhiyi, Li Tongxuan, and Yongming Yanshou, as well as by the Da Zhi Du Lun.

Yuan criticizes those who claimed that Pure Land was dualistic and that Buddhism was all about transcending dualities (and thus reject Pure Land). For Yuan, it is the critics of Pure Land who lack true understanding, since if they truly understood non-duality and emptiness, they would see that the provisional truth of the pure land is not negated by these teachings on ultimate truth. Likewise, the Huayan doctrine of the interpenetration of all phenomena does not negate the individuality of specific realms or relative phenomena.

According to Yuan, Pure Land Buddhism is not just in accord with the highest principles of Mahayana philosophy, but it fulfills them in ways that Chan cannot rival. This is because Pure Land relies on the unity of the ultimate and conventional reality as seen by ordinary people (and is thus skillful for all types of people not just the wise). Furthermore, as Jones explains, if it were true that one needed to fully purify one's mind and have knowledge of the ultimate truth before attaining the pure land, then this would lead to the absurd conclusion that "one would have to be able to adopt the fully enlightened viewpoint before being enlightened - a vicious circle." As such, the Chan critique of Pure Land practitioners is a trivial critique which just points out the obvious, that unenlightened people are not enlightened to the ultimate truth. However, according to Yuan, the Buddha knows how to make use of the very dualistic viewpoints of ordinary beings in order to guide them to awakening through skillful means. Once born in the pure land, ordinary beings will become awakened to the ultimate truth.

To the detractors of Pure land who saw themselves as beyond beyond Pure Land practice, Yuan writes:

You say, "Only purify your own mind, and then what need is there to discriminate?" If you enter a latrine, could you remain there for long? Go into a charnel-house where air is filthy with black smoke. Could you refrain from holding your nose? Could you share your dishes and bed with someone who has scabrous sores oozing pus and blood? If not, then this is a sign that you detest the five defilements. If you still need a clean room and sanitary companions, then this is a sign that you would delight in the Pure Land.

Yuan also saw his Pure Land treatise as a work which shows how Pure Land is deeply connected with other traditions like Chan, Consciousness-Only and Huayan. In a later work he even writes that "I made use of Pure Land in order to expound Chan". Various scholars have also noted how Yuan makes extensive use of Huayan thought in his treatise, especially the philosophy of Li Tongxuan. The Xīfāng hélùn's ten-fascicle structure itself might be based on the Huayan teaching of the ten gates. As such, Yuan was not seeking to refute Chan or present an exclusive view of Pure Land. Instead, he sought to use Pure Land to broaden and expand the understanding of Buddhist practice in his contemporaries.

Throughout the Xīfāng hélùn, Yuan explains the nature of the various pure lands, answers numerous questions and objections about Pure Land Buddhism and provides a scriptural schema (panjiao) and an analysis of Pure Land scriptures. In fascicle five of the Xīfāng hélùn, Yuan discusses the relationship between the practitioner and Amitabha, as well as self-power and Buddha's other-power. According to Yuan (who cites Zhiyi), the Buddha's power is inconceivable and mysterious. As Jones writes, this means that "one cannot pin it down by saying that the practice is effective because of the Buddha's power, the devotee's power, both together, or neither...all dharmas are inconceivable, and one can never fully understand how causes produce effects." Thus, even if one is an unenlightened being or has different understandings of how other-power works, one can practice chanting the Buddha's name and one will still achieve the result of birth in the pure land.

Drawing on the philosophy of Huayan (as well as Tiantai to a lesser extent), Yuan also shows how Pure Land Buddhism is actually in complete agreement with its most refined and deep metaphysical theories, arguing that Pure Land is thus the supreme truth of Buddhism when properly understood. For Yuan, Amitabha Buddha and Huayan's Cosmic Buddha Vairocana are not separate Buddhas and thus Amitabha pervades all realms. He also argues that the simple recitation of the nianfo, when done with a mind of compassion, bodhicitta, and coupled with a moral life, fulfills all Buddhist principles. Yuan also strongly defends the traditional Buddhist course of practice, including generating faith, taking vows, keeping precepts, living with good companions etc.

Yuan's Xīfāng hélùn soon became popular in Chinese Buddhist circles. It was included in the Jiaxing Buddhist Canon and the patriarch Ouyi Zhixu (1599-1655) included it in his Ten Essential [Texts] of Pure Land (Jingtu shi yao 淨土十要). It remains popular to this day, as shown by the space given to it in Guo Peng's 1982 study of Ming and Qing Buddhism.

== Poetry and literature ==
Yuan Hongdao wrote numerous poems and essays which became quite popular during his time. Together with his brothers, he founded a literary circle which came to be known as the Gong'an school. The literary theory of Yuan and his brothers was based on individual expression and individual feeling or "native sensibility" (hsing-ling), rather than some ancient literary model or method. As such, the Yuan brothers rejected the idea that writers had to mimic the work and styles of past Tang masters like Li Po. According to Yuan Hongdao, literary styles should naturally change to match the evolution of society. He wrote in a letter to a friend that "In general, things are prized when they are authentic. If I am to be authentic, then my face cannot be the same as your face, and how much less the face of some man of antiquity!". Yuan also admired the writings and literature of folk composers and vernacular Chinese authors, including Shi Nai'an's Water Margin.

Some of Yuan's poems have been collected and translated in Jonathan Chaves' Pilgrim of the Clouds: Poems and Essays from Ming Dynasty China (first published in 1978).

=== Longzhong (Within the Hill) ===
The following poem from Yuan Hongdao captures the unity of stillness and movement, the interfusion of all phenomena, including human and natural events:

The cloud rises; a few peaks darken;

The light of the stream evokes dreams of Duke Wu.

The forest is deep; the cloud bird is strange;

In the village's quiet, a thin spring flows.

The stubborn stone empties the dragon's lair;

Spring flowers climb the fox's mound.

Who has taken the sun and made it rest atop—

In exchange for the toil of establishing the tripod of the Three Kingdoms?

(雲起数峰幽 溪光夢武侯 樹深雲鳥怪 村靜細泉流 頑石虛龍臥 春花上貉丘 誰將日高睡 易彼鼎分愁)

=== On meeting my Elder Brother Upon Arriving in the Capital ===
You have turned your back on the busy crowds of the world and chant to yourself from secondhand books.

Your official post is not important

you have few contacts with people;

a long stay in the capital has brought new wrinkles to your face.

On the cracked walls are portraits of Buddhist monks;

high in the windows, birds' nests can be seen.

Editor at the Academy—not the greatest job,

but still, be careful of the wind and waves!

=== Making Fun of Myself on "People Day" ===
This official wears no official sash,

this farmer pushes no plow,

this Confucian does not read books,

this recluse does not live in the wilds.

In society, he wears lotus leaves for clothes,

among commoners, he is decked out m cap and jade.

His serenity is achieved without closing the door,

his teaching is done without instruction.

This Buddhist monk has long hair and whiskers,

this Taoist immortal makes love to beautiful women.

One moment, withering away in a silent forest,

the next, bustling through crowds on city streets.

When he sees flowers, he calls for singing girls;

when he has wine to drink, he calls for a pair of dice.

His body is as light as a cloud

floating above the Great Clod.

Try asking the bird, flying in the air:

"What clear pond reflects your image?"

How free! the dragon, curling, leaping,

liberated! beyond this world, or in it.

The official, Liu-hsia Hui, firm, yet harmonious;

or Hermit Yi, pure in his retirement.

== Bibliography ==
- Chaves, Jonathan trans. Pilgrim of the Clouds, New York-Tokyo, 1978; new edition Buffalo New York: White Pine Press, 2005.
- Carpenter, Bruce E. "The Gentleman of Stones: Yüan Hung-tao", Tezukayama University Review (Tezukayama Daigaku ronshu), Nara, Japan, no. 24, 1979. ISSN 0385-7743
- Mair, Victor H. (ed.) (2001). The Columbia History of Chinese Literature. New York: Columbia University Press. ISBN 0-231-10984-9. (Amazon Kindle edition.)
