= Gui Youguang =

Chinese writer

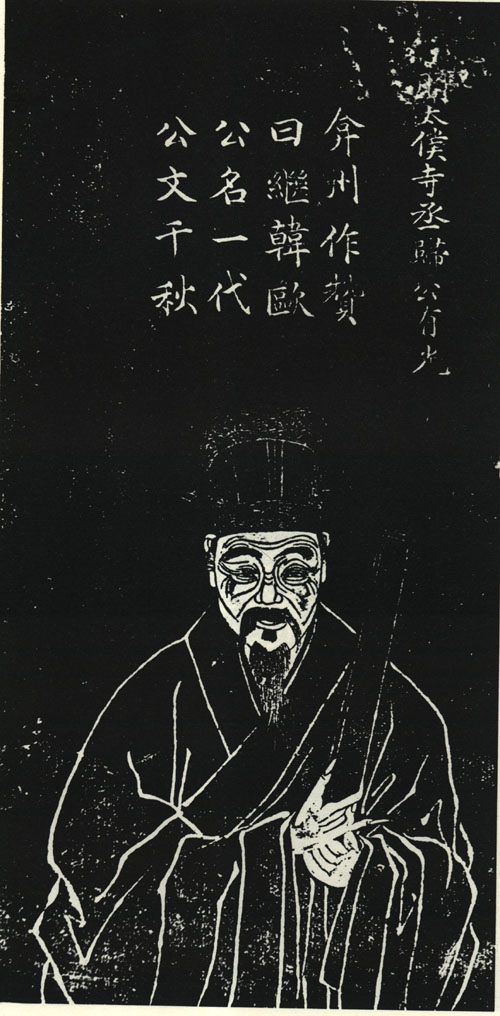
Gui Youguang

Gui Youguang (simplified Chinese: 归有光; traditional Chinese: 歸有光; pinyin: Guī Yǒuguāng; 1507–1571) was a Chinese writer of Ming Dynasty. His courtesy name was Xifu (熙甫) and his art name was Zhenchuan (震川), and he was also known as Xiangji Sheng (項脊生, literally Scholar of Xiangji).

His prose writings were highly praised. People of his time regarded him as a modern-day Ouyang Xiu, an important writer of the earlier Song Dynasty, and later generations praised his works as "the best prose of the Ming Dynasty". He was one of the early masters of the xiaopin.

== Names and titles ==
=== Youguang ===
When Gui's mother conceived him, it was said that there was a rainbow glowed in the yard, while its light reached the sky, which was deemed lucky. Accordingly, he was gaven the name "Youguang", literally "There was a light" in Chinese.

=== Zhenchuan ===
Gui detested art names when he was young. Once he was noticed as an exception without one at a party, thus the others began to call him "Zhenchuan". It is a compound of two geographical nouns: "zhen" refers to "Zhenze" (震澤), the ancient name of Lake Tai which adjoins his hometown, while "chuan" is a synonym for river in Chinese, refers to the Yangtze River sometimes. However, Gui still rejected that until he met He Qitu (何啓圖), an erudite scholar from Henan who happened to share the same art name with him. Gui took "Zhenchuan" out of admiration for He, he also made an analogy between them and Sima Xiangru together with Lin Xiangru.

=== Xiangji Sheng ===
Gui's ancestors once lived along a river call Xiangjijing (項脊涇) in Taicang during Yuan dynasty, later he designate his sanctum as Xiangjixuan (項脊軒) to commemorate them probably. Hence, Gui called himself Xiangji Sheng. While "Xiangji" is supposed to be the abbreviation of "Xiangjixuan".

== Biography ==
Gui Youguang was born on January 6, 1507, into a once-prominent but declining family in Kunshan County, Suzhou Prefecture. At the age of eight, his 25-year-old mother died, leaving behind three sons and two daughters. His father, a poor county scholar, could not prevent the family's rapid impoverishment.

Unfulfilled Potential

From childhood, Gui Youguang displayed extraordinary intelligence. By nine, he could compose essays, and at ten, he wrote the thousand-word "On Begging for Vinegar." By eleven or twelve, he had already aspired to emulate the ancients. At fourteen, he took the child prodigy examination, and at twenty, he ranked first, earning the title of xiucai (government student) in Suzhou Prefecture. That same year, he traveled to Nanjing to take the provincial examination.

Initially confident in his scholarly pursuits, Gui Youguang repeatedly failed the provincial exams. After five attempts in Nanjing and fifteen years of arduous study, he finally achieved success in 1540 at the age of 35. The chief examiner, Zhang Zhi, greatly admired him, ranking him second among the provincial graduates (举人) and expecting him to soon become a jinshi (metropolitan graduate).

By then, Gui Youguang had gained a reputation for profound learning. His essays, along with Yu Zhongwei's poetry and Zhang Zibin's exam compositions, were hailed as the "Three Wonders of Kunshan." Given his talent and prestige, passing the jinshi examination seemed assured. That winter, he hurried north to prepare for the following year's metropolitan examination, only to face yet another failure.

Returning south, Gui Youguang settled near the Anting River in Jiading, where he balanced exam preparation with teaching. Students flocked to him, ranging from a dozen to over a hundred at times. Despite his family's poverty, his wife, Mrs Wang, managed the household, cultivating over forty acres of land and overseeing servants in reclaiming wasteland. She ensured the family and students were fed, allowing Gui Youguang to focus on teaching. His disciples revered him, and scholars nationwide honored him as "Master Zhenchuan."

Yet, misfortune persisted. Gui Youguang failed the jinshi exam eight times. At 43, he lost his beloved eldest son, and a year later, his wife Mrs Wang died.

In 1554, when Japanese pirates raided China's southeastern coast, Gui Youguang offered defensive strategies in works like "Notes on Coastal Defense," "On Resisting Pirates," and "Letter to the Commander-in-Chief." He later documented the pirate attacks in "A Record of the Pirate Raids in Kunshan" and "Fourteen Poems on Maritime Events," expressing patriotic fervor.

Late-Life Official Career

Despite repeated failures, Gui Youguang persevered. In 1565, at sixty, he finally passed the metropolitan exam as a third-tier jinshi, earning only a remote magistracy in Changxing.

There, he established schools, mentored students, combated corruption, and overturned unjust convictions. Upholding integrity, he refused to comply with impractical orders from superiors, declaring in "Public Notice on Changxing's Tax Reform": "As magistrate, I serve only the court’s laws and the people's welfare. I will not flatter superiors for promotions, nor fear slander." His two-year tenure won public admiration but drew official displeasure.

In 1568, at sixty-three, Gui Youguang was demoted to Tongpan of Shunde Prefecture (modern Xingtai, Hebei), overseeing horse administration—a post typically beneath a jinshi's status. Resentful, he twice petitioned to resign, but his requests were suppressed. In protest, he secluded himself in a study, reading for solace. Yet, he still performed his duties diligently, compiling "Records of Horse Administration."

Death with Unfulfilled Ambitions

In 1570, Gui Youguang attended the imperial birthday celebrations in the capital. Recommended by Grand Secretaries Gao Gong and Zhao Zhenji, he was promoted to Assistant Minister of the Court of the Imperial Stud in Nanjing. Later, Chief Grand Secretary Li Chunfang retained him in the Hanlin Academy to compile the "Veritable Records of Emperor Shizong."

Finally achieving late-career success, Gui Youguang hoped to access rare imperial archives for scholarly advancement. However, overwork led to severe illness. After just a year in office, he died on February 7, 1571, at sixty-six, his ambitions unfulfilled. He was buried in Jintongli, southeast of Kunshan's city gate.

== Family ==
Gui's father was Zheng (正), while his mother was Zhou Gui (周桂). He had two younger brothers: Youshang (有尚) and Yougong (有功); An elder sister Shujing (淑靜) and a younger sister Shushun (淑順).

Gui had three wives and a concubine.

His first wife's surname was Wei. They married in about 1529, five year later she died. They had a daughter and a son. In about 1536, he married Wang. Wang died in about 1552, one year later, Gui married to his third wife Fei (費).

Hanhua (寒花) initially was a handmaiden accompanying Wei; when Wei married, she was only nine years old. After Wei's death, she became Gui's concubine, before she died at the age of 18.

Sons: Zixiao (子孝) or Zengsun as birth name (䎖孫; 1533–1548?), Zihu (子祜), Zining (子寧), Longsun (隆孫), Zijun (子駿), Zimu (子慕), Zixiao (子蕭)

Daughters: Rulan (如蘭; 1534–1535), Erer (二二; 1538–1539) and other three.

== Writings ==
Gui was one of mid-Ming notable writers of the xiaopin.

Books:

- Sanwu shuili lu (三吳水利錄)
- Mazheng zhi (馬政誌)
- Taipu zhi (太僕誌)

Travel notes:

- Jiwei fushi zaji (己未復試雜記)
- Renxu jixing (壬戌紀行)

Prose (including lesser works, or xiaopin):

- Xiangjixuan zhi (項脊軒志)
- Xianbi shilue (先妣事略)
- Siziting ji (思子亭記)
- Nü Erer kuangzhi (女二二壙誌)
- Baojieshan juji (寶界山居記)
- Juchuang ji (菊窗記)

== Influence ==
=== Advocating Reform in Prose Style ===
During the mid-Ming Dynasty, the Classical Revival Movement led by the Former and Latter Seven Masters dominated literary circles. While initially effective in countering the rigid Cabinet Style prose, by the Jiajing era it had degenerated into blind antiquarianism. Gui Youguang, as a leading figure of the Tang-Song School, courageously opposed this trend. He argued that while Qin-Han period works like Records of the Grand Historian were undoubtedly excellent, the prose of Tang-Song masters like Ouyang Xiu and Zeng Gong possessed equal merit. In his Preface to Xiang Siyao's Collected Works, he sharply criticized the literary authority Wang Shizhen as "a mediocre imitator". Interestingly, in his later years, even Wang Shizhen came to acknowledge the superiority of Gui's natural and unadorned style, praising it in his Eulogy for Gui Taipu.

=== Prose Characteristics ===
Gui Youguang's prose is renowned for its emotional authenticity and attention to everyday life. His representative work Memoir of Xiangjixuan masterfully intertwines memories of his grandmother, mother and wife with reflections on the vicissitudes of life through the lens of a family study. The art of his prose manifests in four aspects: Firstly, his ability to express profound emotions through ordinary events; secondly, his exceptional skill in capturing telling details; thirdly, his concise yet meaningful style - most famous essays like Memoir of My Deceased Mother and Epitaph for Hanhua are under 1,000 words; fourthly, his sophisticated structures that blend narration, description and argumentation seamlessly, as seen in JuchuangJi.

=== Contributions to Water Management ===
While residing in Anting, Gui conducted thorough research on Taihu Lake's hydrological issues. Contrary to the prevailing opinion of his time, he insightfully proposed that dredging and widening Wusong River, rather than draining Taihu Lake, was the optimal solution to the region's flooding problems. His famous statement "Water may harm people, but it also benefits them. Even if Taihu Lake dried up, how would that serve the people's interests?" demonstrates his profound understanding of water management. His four-volume Hydrological Records of the Three Wu Regions systematically compiled historical documents and contemporary research, remaining an invaluable resource for studying Jiangnan's water conservancy history.

=== Book Collection ===
The Gui family's Shimei Hall library, established by Gui's father along the Anting River, became a cultural landmark. Gui and his wife Wang were both passionate bibliophiles - Wang would send maids to search for rare books whenever she heard of them. Their collection bore several exquisite seals including "Shimei Hall Treasure" and "Twenty-second Generation Descendant of Duke Wenzheng of Wei". Gui edited Zhuzi Huihan, an ambitious collection of 94 philosophical works from Zhou dynasty to Ming period, though some scholars question its authenticity.

== Cited works ==
- Qian Qianyi (1659). Liechao shiji xiaozhuan (列朝詩集小傳) (in Chinese).
- Gui Youguang (1675). Zhenchuan xiansheng ji (震川先生集) [Collection of Sir Zhenchuan] (in Chinese).
- Zhang Tingyu; et al. (eds.). Ming shi (明史) [History of Ming] (in Chinese).
- Mair, Victor H. (ed.) (2001). The Columbia History of Chinese Literature. New York: Columbia University Press. ISBN 0-231-10984-9. (Amazon Kindle edition.)
- Huang, Lin (2007). 归有光与嘉定四先生研究 (in Chinese). Shanghai: Shanghai Guji Press. ISBN 978-7-532-54968-9.
- Chang, Kang-i Sun (2010). The Cambridge History of Chinese Literature, Volume II: From 1375. Shanghai: Cambridge University Press. ISBN 978-0-521-85559-4.
