= Chen Jiru =

Chinese artist (1558–1639)

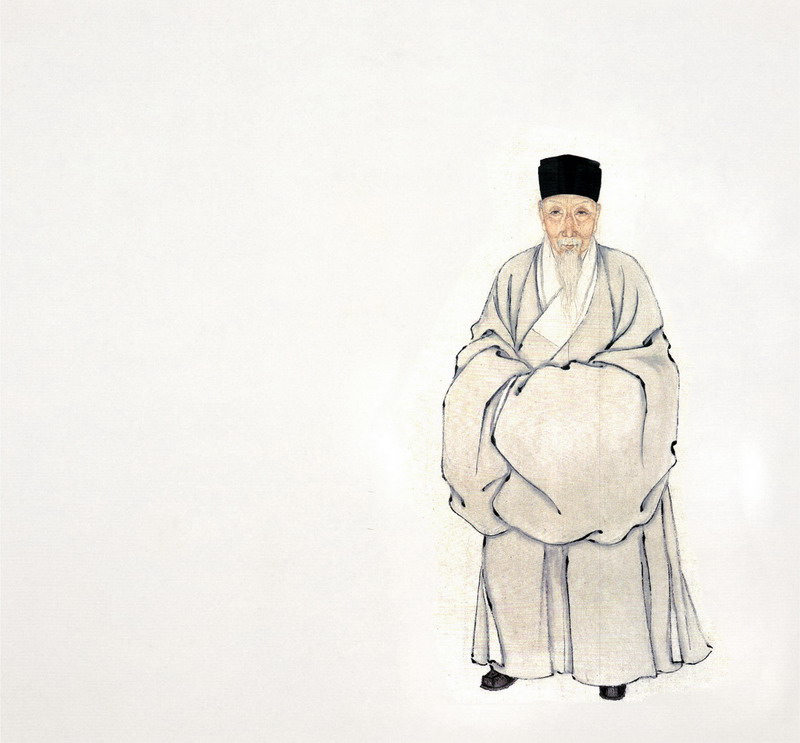
Portrait of Chen Jiru

Chen Jiru (simplified Chinese: 陈继儒; traditional Chinese: 陳繼儒; pinyin: Chén Jìrú; Wade–Giles: Ch'en Chi-ju; 1558–1639) was a Chinese landscape painter, calligrapher and essayist during the Ming dynasty (1368–1644). He was a notable author of the xiaopin, a form of short literary essay.

== Biography ==
Chen was born in Huating (华亭; present-day Songjiang District, Shanghai). His courtesy name was Zhongchun (仲醇) and his pseudonyms were Migong (麋公) and Meigong (眉公). Chen's calligraphy followed the style of Su Shi and Mi Fu. Chen also painted landscapes and elegant still lifes.

== Works ==
In 1595, he wrote Tea Talks (茶董補), still often quoted in China and Japan, and he studied pottery and created purple clay teapots in the Yixing style. His Shallow Comments on the Art of Nourishing Life as well as A Gentleman's Remarks on Diet were a reference for many years.

Chen Jiru left an autobiography which contains a "patently fictitious account of the circumstances of his own death, a most extraordinary innovation," writes the modern scholar Pei-yi Wu, describing Chen as "a member of the literati known for his versatile artistic talents."

In 2007, Jamie Greenbaum, a researcher at the University of Beijing, published a book on Chen Jiru's writings which provides an overview of his larger-than-life personality, as well as an account of the different literary personae he invented.

== Bibliography ==
- Ci hai bian ji wei yuan hui (辞海编辑委员会. Ci hai (辞海. Shanghai: Shanghai ci shu chu ban she (上海辞书出版社), 1979.
- Greenbaum, Jamie (2007). Chen Jiru (1558-1639). BRILL. ISBN 978-90-04-16358-4.
- Mair, Victor H. (ed.) (2001). The Columbia History of Chinese Literature. New York: Columbia University Press. ISBN 0-231-10984-9. (Amazon Kindle edition.)
- Hummel, Arthur W. Sr., ed. (1943). "Ch'ên Chi-ju" . Eminent Chinese of the Ch'ing Period. United States Government Printing Office.
