= Wen Zhenheng =

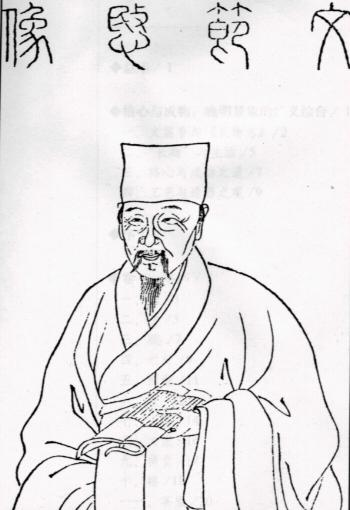
Wen Zhenheng

Wen Zhenheng (Chinese: 文震亨; pinyin: Wén Zhènhēng; Wade–Giles: Wen Chen-heng, 1585–1645) was a Ming dynasty scholar, painter, landscape garden designer, and great grandson of Wen Zhengming, a famous Ming dynasty painter.

Wen was born in Suzhou in 1585. In 1621, he graduated from the Imperial Academy, obtained the lowest degree of zhusheng. In 1637, Wen was the assistant magistrate of Longzhou county in the Shanxi prefecture. On the same year, he was appointed Secretariat Drafter by Chongzhen Emperor. Wen Zhenheng was famous for his calligraphy, poetry and essays. He was also an expert in landscape garden design, the Sweetgrass Garden he built in Suzhou was famous at his time.

== Treatise on Superfluous Things ==
Wen Zhenheng's best known work Zhang Wu Zhi (traditional: 長物志, simplified:长物志, "Treatise on Superfluous Things") written between 1620-1627 was an encyclopedic book about garden architecture and interior design.

Zhang Wu Zhi was divided into twelve volumes:

- Vol 1. House and Dwelling—17 chapters
- Vol 2. Flowers and Trees—43 chapters
- Vol 3. Water and Stones - 18 chapters
- Vol 4. Fowl and Fish—11 chapters
- Vol 5. Books and Paintings - 26 chapters
- Vol 6. Chairs and Beds—20 chapters
- Vol 7. Utensils—58 chapters
- Vol 8. Cloths and accessories—10 chapters
- Vol 9. Boat and carriage—4 chapters
- Vol 10. Arrangement—11 chapters
- Vol 11. Vegetable and Fruits—27 chapters
- Vol 12. Incense and Tea—24 chapters
