= The Columbia History of Chinese Literature =

2002 reference book

- Editor: Victor H. Mair
- Language: English
- Publisher: Columbia University Press
- Publication date: 2002

The Columbia History of Chinese Literature is a reference book edited by Victor H. Mair and published by the Columbia University Press in 2002. The topics include all genres and periods of poetry, prose, fiction, and drama but also areas not traditionally thought of as literature, such as wit and humour, proverbs and rhetoric, historical and philosophical writings, classical exegesis, literary theory and criticism, traditional fiction commentary, as well as popular culture, the impact of religion upon literature, the role of women, and the relationship with non-Chinese languages and ethnic minorities. There are also chapters on Chinese literature in Korea, Japan, and Vietnam.

== Content ==
The book has 1,342 pages, comprising 55 chapters written by 45 contributors. Because this book is a history of literature and not an anthology, the only actual portions of Chinese literature in the work are occasional short quotations. Prominent specialists in their fields are the authors of most of the chapters in the book.

Chinese characters do not appear in the main text of the book and the system of romanization used is Wade-Giles, not pinyin. There are no footnotes but there are references in the text. Three glossaries give Chinese characters for terms, proper names, and titles for books, sections of books, and articles.

There is also an index and a list of books that are suggested further reading. The suggested further reading list includes specialized and technical studies in European and Asian languages. There is also an associated online bibliography that is a companion to the book.

Giovanni Vitello of the University of Naples "L'Orientale" wrote that compared to previous histories of Chinese literature, this book included "a yet greater number of essays on cultural issues" as well as an exploration of gender in literature, "While still basically privileging literary genres in its organization".

=== Chapters ===
There are seven main sections, within which chapters are in chronological order: Foundations; Poetry; Prose; Fiction; Drama; Commentary, Criticism, and Interpretation; and Popular and Peripheral Manifestations. The time ranges of these chapters stretch from the first millennium B.C. to the present. Dean wrote that "All the discussions deal with the social, political, and philosophical backgrounds that either inhabit or inhibit the literature." Mather wrote that the book has "expected chapters on the development of prose and poetry, history, drama and fiction, with an analysis of distinctive genres within each of these categories" but that it "devotes considerable additional space to less expected subjects". Topics include relationship between art and literature, classics, classical exegesis, folk tales, humor and wit, literary criticism, literature by ethnic minorities, literature by women, myths, religious texts, supernatural elements, and reception of Chinese literature in Japan, Korea, and Vietnam.

== Reception ==
Richard Mather stated that the book is "a monumental contribution to the field of Chinese literary studies", and that the "thoroughness and general soundness of its treatment of all periods and genres will doubtless remain the most comprehensive single source for students of Chinese literature of all periods for some time to come." Kitty Chen Dean of Nassau Community College wrote that even though the book's main text has a lack of Chinese characters and that "everything is translated" it is "difficult reading" because of the "many transliterated titles, authors' names, and dates". However, she "[h]ighly recommended" the book.

Fuehrer stated that "nobody with a serious interest in Chinese literature can possibly disregard this comprehensive and most inspiring volume." He argued that what he would have wanted to see was "more detailed pointers to reference and source material" and he also argued that the lack of "focused and detailed" endnotes and/or footnotes are not made up by the presence of the further reading suggestions, and that "the lack of source references makes it difficult to trace a particular author's views and to contextualise them in the wider framework of Sinological scholarship."
