= Yuanlingshan =

Traditional Chinese round collar gown

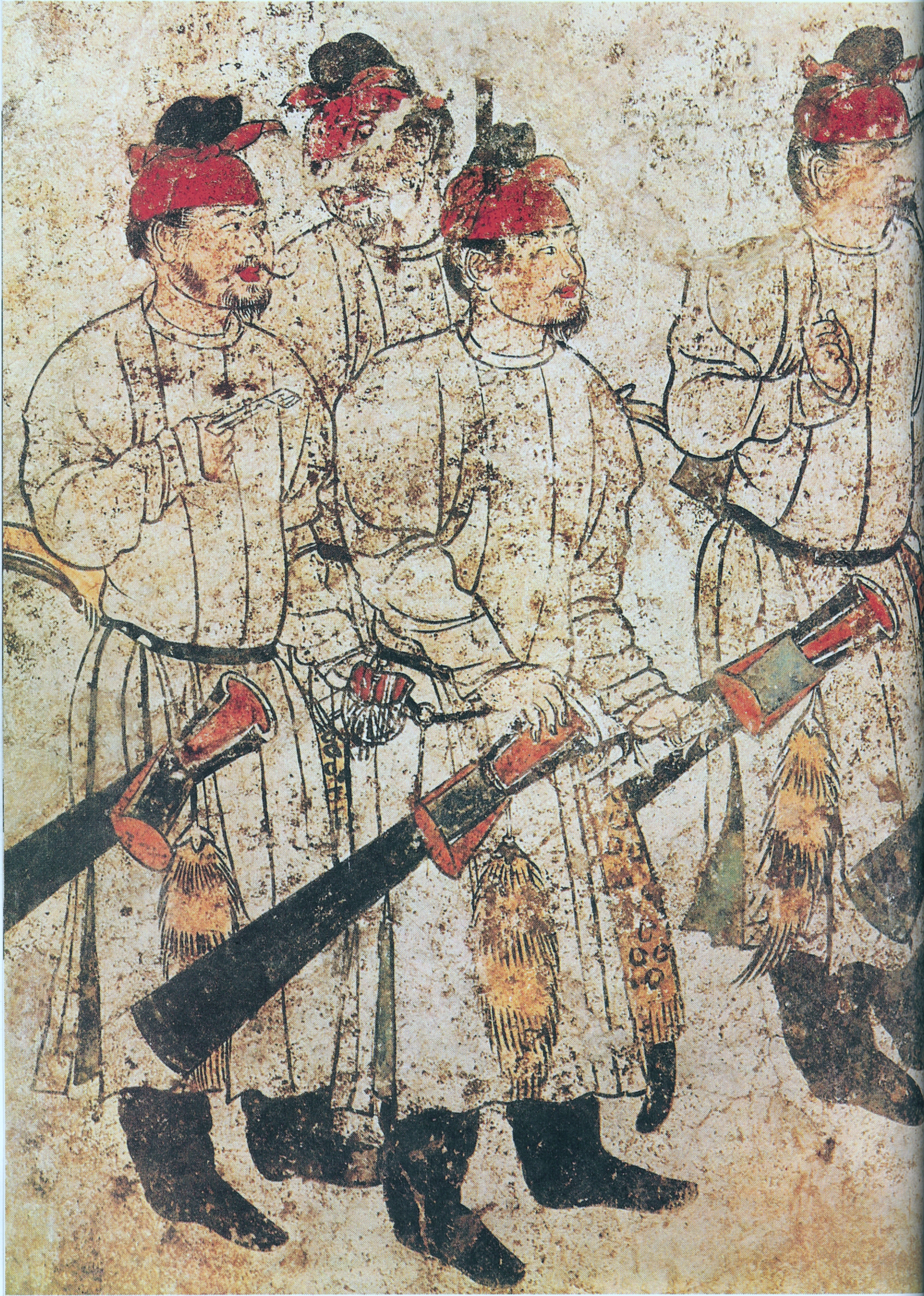
- Men wearing yuanlingpao, Tang dynasty painting, 706 AD.

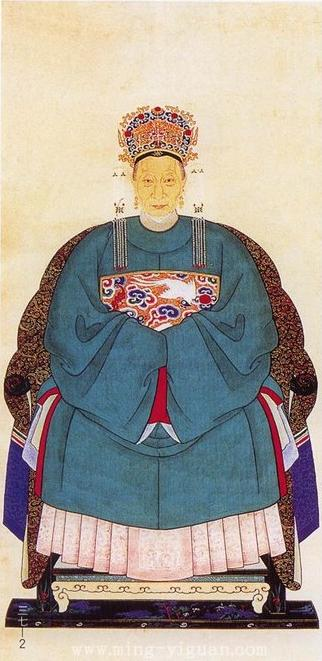
- Woman wearing a yuanlingshan with a skirt, Ming dynasty

Chinese name
- Traditional Chinese: 圓領衫
- Simplified Chinese: 圆领衫
- Literal meaning: Round collar shirt
Transcriptions
Standard Mandarin
- Hanyu Pinyin: Yuánlǐngshān

Alternative Chinese name
- Traditional Chinese: 圓領袍
- Simplified Chinese: 圆领袍
- Literal meaning: Round collar robe/ Round collar gown
Transcriptions
Standard Mandarin
- Hanyu Pinyin: Yuánlǐngpáo

Third alternative Chinese name
- Traditional Chinese: 盤領袍
- Simplified Chinese: 盘领袍
Transcriptions

English name
- English: Round collar robe

A yuanlingshan (Chinese: 圓領衫; pinyin: yuánlǐngshān; lit. 'round collar jacket') is a type of round-collared upper garment (shan) in the traditional Chinese style of clothing known as Hanfu; it is also referred to as a yuánlǐngpáo (圓領袍; 'round collar gown/robe') or a pánlǐngpáo (盤領袍) when used as a robe (called paofu).

Quling (Chinese: 曲領; pinyin: Qū lǐng; lit. 'Curved collar') refers to clothing with a round or arc-shaped neckline, which is one of the important forms of Hanfu. Yuanlingshan falls under this category.The origins of Yuanlingshan are currently unknown. However, current research suggests that Quling existed during the Shang dynasty, so Yuanlingshan existed before the Western Han dynasty.

The yuanlingpao is an article of formal attire primarily worn by men, but women can also wear them. In the Tang dynasty, the yuanlingpao could be transformed into the fanlingpao using buttons.

There are specific forms of yuanlingpao and yuanlingshan named for their decorations and construction; for example, the panling lanshan (盤領襴衫), also called lanshan (襴衫) for short, bufu, wulingshan (無領衫; 'collarless shirt'), longpao (龍袍; 'dragon robe'), and mangfu (蟒服; 'python clothing').

== Terminology ==
The term yuanlingshan literally translates to "round collar shirt", consisting of the Chinese characters yuanling (圆领), which literally translates to "round collar" and shan (衫), literally translated as "shirt".

The term yuanlingpao literally translates to "round collar robe (or gown)", consisting of the Chinese characters yuanling and pao (袍). Pao is an abbreviation for the term paofu (袍服), which is literally translated as "robe" or "gown".

The term panling lanshan (盤領襴衫) or simply lanshan (襴衫) refers to a specific variation of yuanlingpao characterized by a bottom horizontal band attached at the knee level, while following the overall form of the shenyi, a long robe.

The term bufu (补服) is a generic term referring to clothing adorned with a rank badge known as bǔzi (补子), which is often a mandarin square or roundels, to indicate its wearer's rank. Such garments were typically worn by government officials.

When a yuanlingpao or yuanlingshan is decorated with Chinese dragons called long (龙; 龍) or decorated with mang (蟒; 'python') decorations, including roundels or square rank badges, the generic term longpao or mangfu is applied respectively depending on the number of dragon-claws used and the time period. (Note: A Chinese dragon can be found with 3, 4 or 5 claws. From ancient times to the Song dynasty, Chinese dragons were typically depicted with 3 claws. From the Ming dynasty, a Chinese dragon was defined as having 5 claws while the 4-clawed dragon was referred to as mang (python). There is a clear difference between the Dragon robe and mangfu. See page Mangfu, Dragon robe, Japanese dragon for more details.)

== History ==
=== Before and during the Han dynasty ===
The origin of yuanlingpao is currently unknown. However, current research suggests that yuanlingpao existed during the Shang dynasty, at this time usually used as outerwear. By the Zhou dynasty, yuanlingpao was already commonly used as military uniform, and in daily life as outerwear and underwear, and subsequent dynasties inherited this practice. It is known that yuanlingpao was used as both outerwear and underwear during the Western Han dynasty. But more often, it is mainly used as underwear, but children and women often wear it as outerwear. Starting from the Eastern Han dynasty, although yuanlingpao was also used as underwear, it has returned to being used as outerwear more and more frequently, until it became one of the common outerwear in the Wei and Jin dynasties. The collars of the Han dynasty yuanlingpao were not turned on both sides and their edges were similar to the styles worn in the Sui and Tang dynasties. It was also during the early years of the Han dynasty that the shape of the yuanlingpao worn in the later dynasties, such as in the Ming dynasties, started to develop.

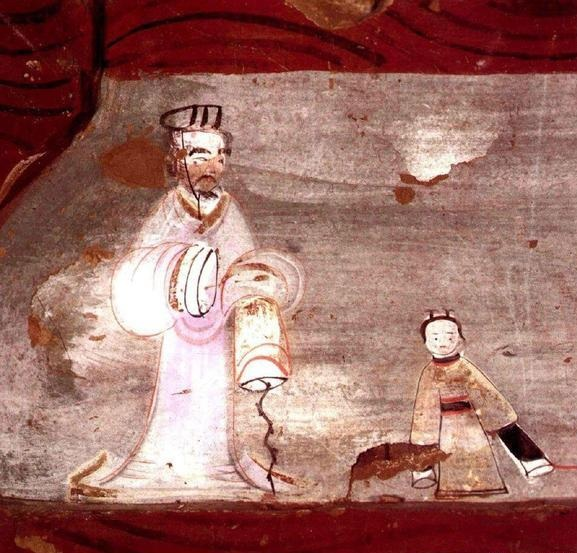
A child wearing yuanlingpao and a gentleman, late Western Han dynasty.

=== Wei, Jin, Northern, and Southern dynasties / Six Dynasties ===
According to the History of the Southern Dynasties, the clothing of the Hu people was a long robe with Tight sleeves, while the Western Wei murals show a round collar, a double-breasted front, and a long robe with narrow sleeves.This type of clothing with a double-breasted collar and narrow sleeves appeared in the Western Zhou dynasty and continued into the following dynasties. Therefore, current scholars believe that the round-necked clothing of the Hu people was influenced by the military uniforms of the Qin and Qin dynasty. As time went by, a round-necked garment with the obvious characteristics of the narrow-sleeved long robe of the Qin and Qin dynasty military uniform was formed, but with national characteristics and tailoring system.

==== Influence of the Xianbei ====
When the Wuhu migrated to the Central Plains, their dressing culture influenced the clothing culture of the Han people in the region.These northern nomads, including the Xianbei, also introduced new clothing styles, including the quekua (缺胯), a type of crotch-length long jacket. The quekua had either a round or snug (plunged) collar, tight sleeves, and less overlap than the traditional Hanfu, which allowed for greater freedom of movement, especially for horse riding, and strongly impacted Chinese fashion.

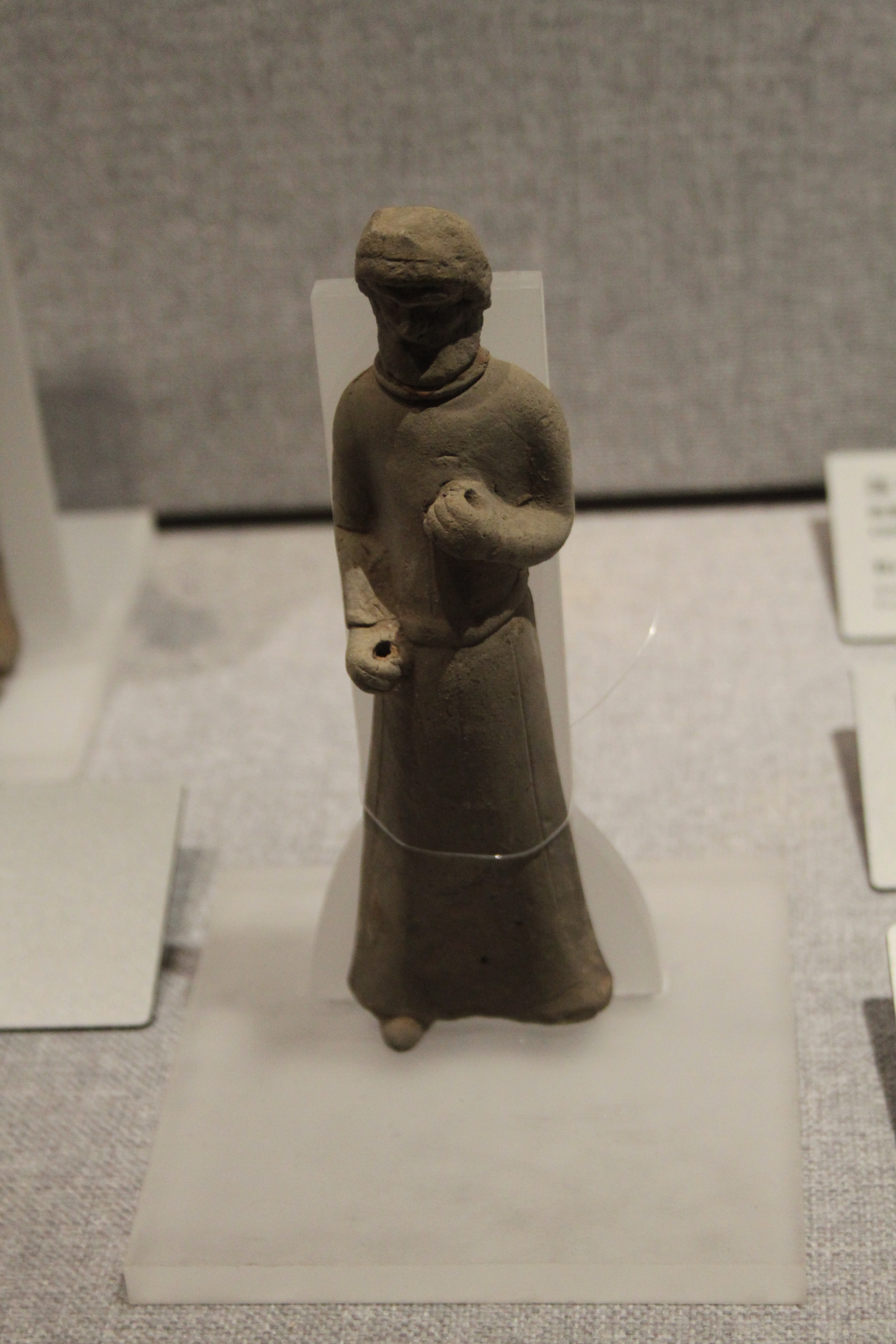
Panling lanshan, Wei, Jin, or Southern-Northern Dynasties

The Northern Wei dynasty was marked by cultural integration between the Xianbei and the Han Chinese. The Xianbei ruling elites adopted Chinese clothing and Chinese customs, while the Han Chinese started to integrate some of the Xianbei's nomadic style clothing, including high boots and narrow-sleeved yuanlingpao and yuanlingshan into Han clothing. In this period, the yuanlingpao worn by unearthed terracotta warriors were closed in the zuoren-style instead of youren-style, reflecting its Hufu characteristics. (Note: Zuoren refers to having the garment closing on the left side while youren refers to having the garments closing on the right side.) Since the Northern Wei dynasty, the shapes of the Han Chinese's paofu also started to be influenced by the yuanlingpao-style robe, which originated in Western Asia and was then spread to the East through the Sogdians of Central Asia.

In the Northern and Southern dynasties, the yuanlingpao of the Xianbei was localized by the Han Chinese, resulting in a loss of its association with Hufu and developed into a new form of Hanfu, called panling lanshan. This evolution was achieved through the addition of a new seam structure called lán (襕), which aligned with the traditional Hanfu style and followed the Han Chinese's shenyi robe.

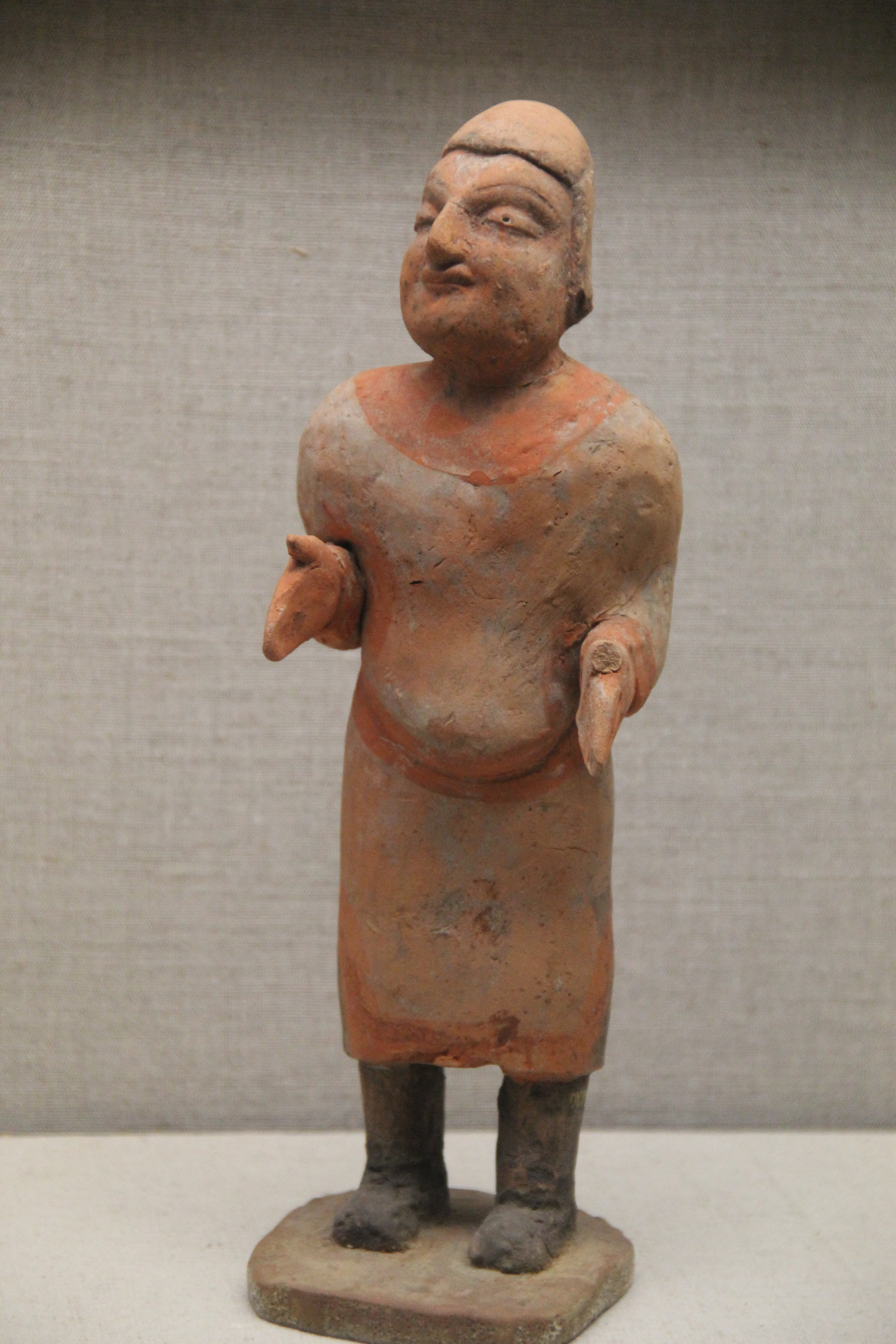
Yuanlingpao worn by an acrobat figure, Northern Wei

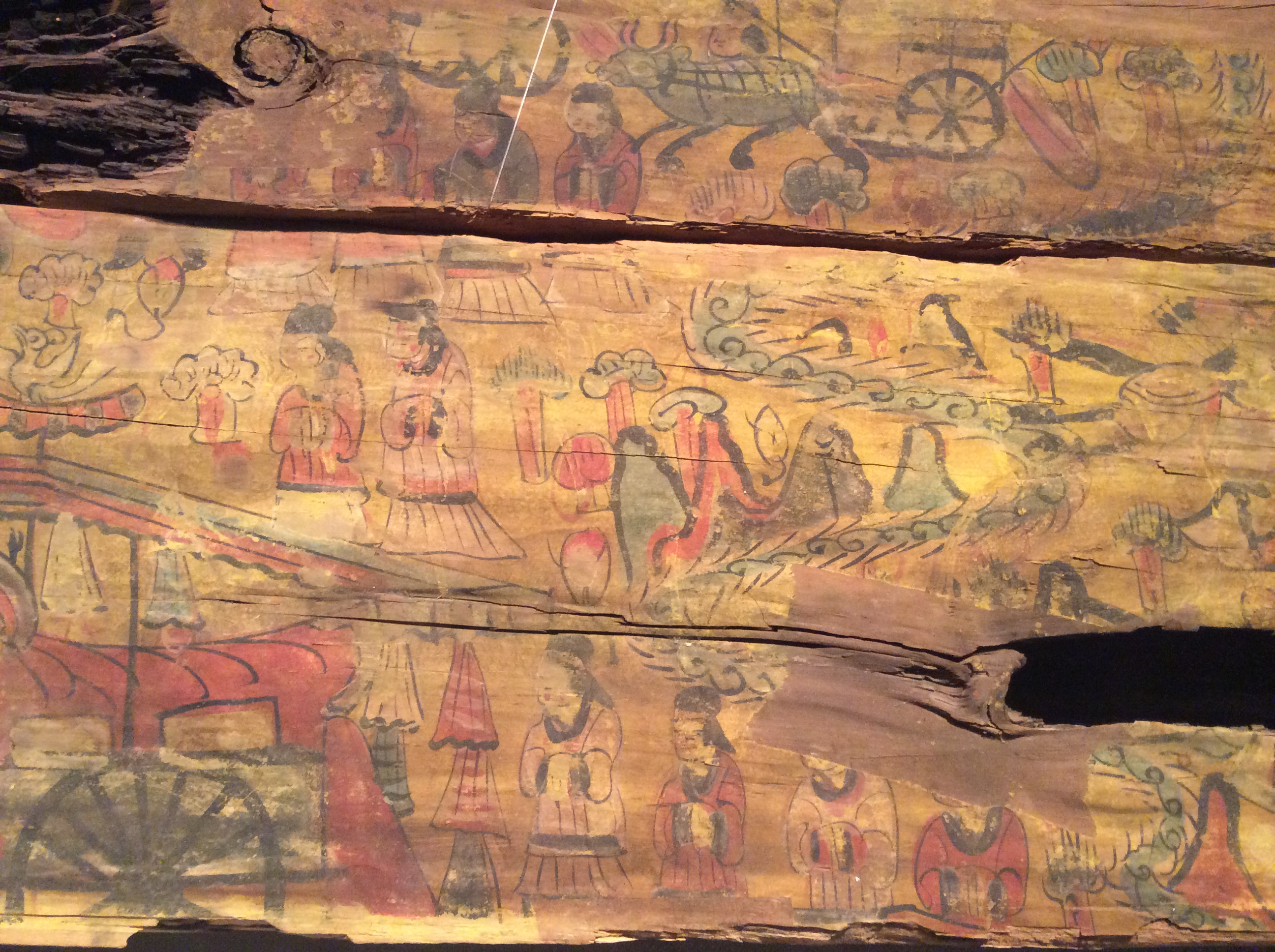
Women wearing yuanlingshan with skirt, Northern Wei, Datong

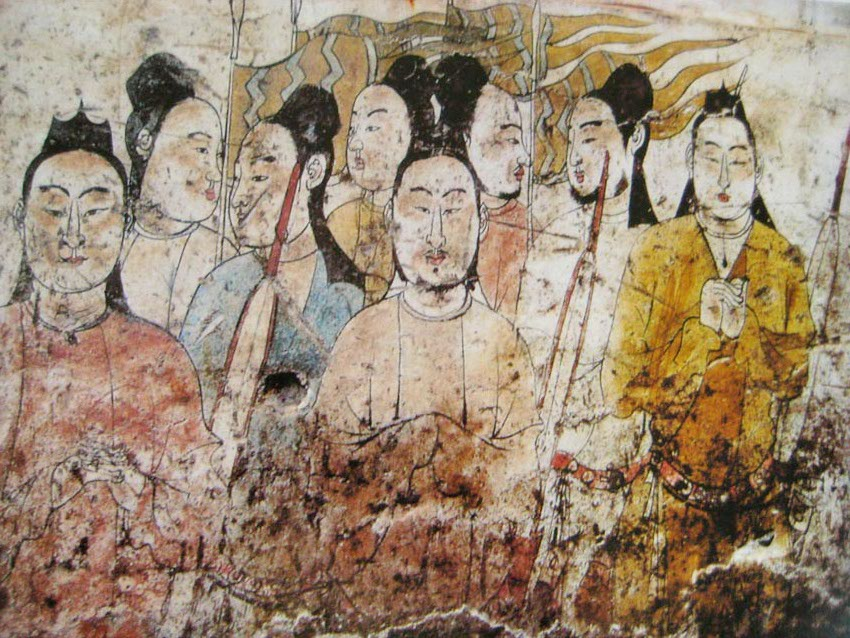
Xianbei men wearing quekua in the form yuanlingpao, Fresco from the Tomb of Lou Rui, Northern Qi (550-577 AD)

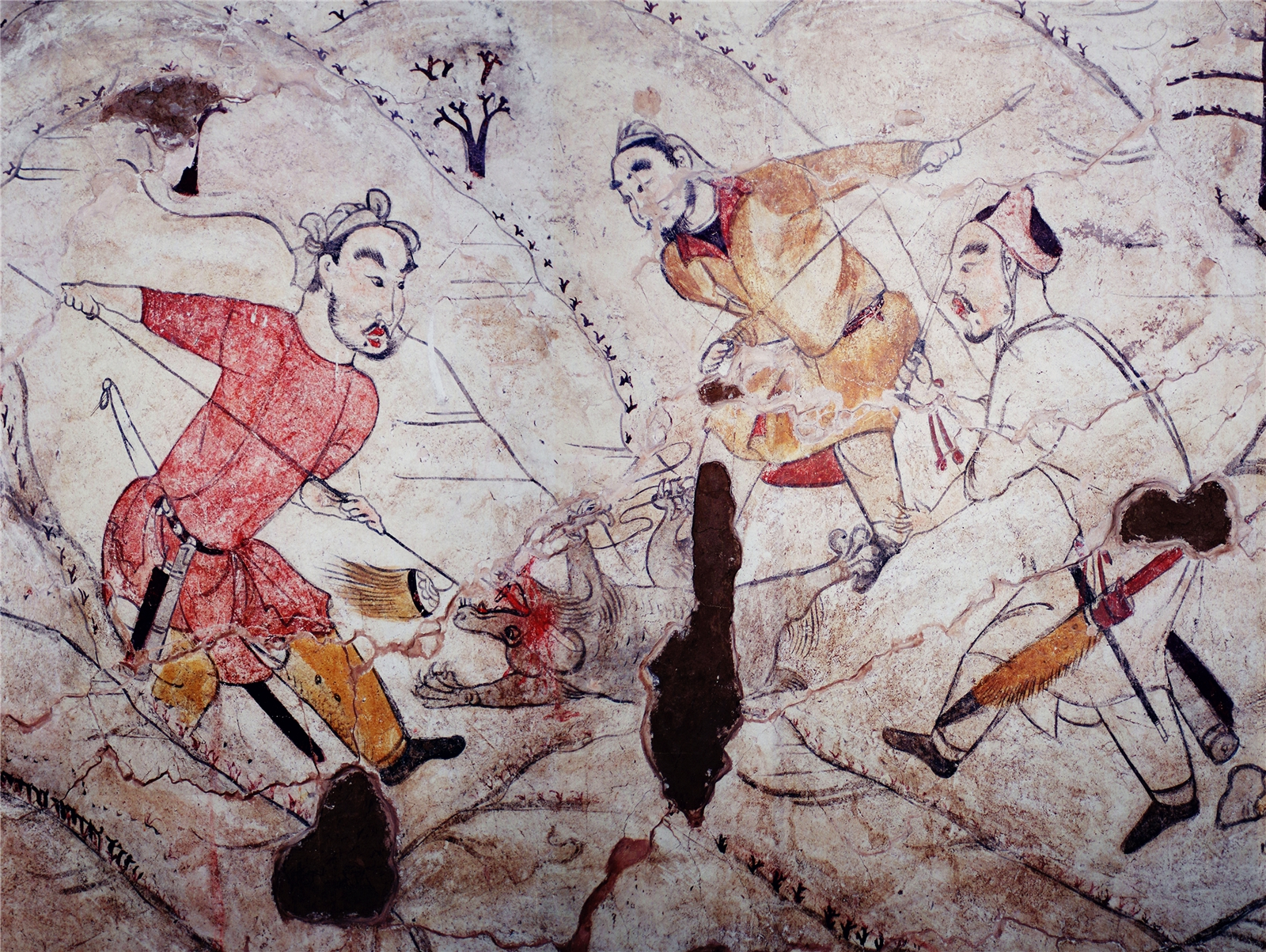
Xianbei men wearing quekua in the form of yualingpao and the lapel gown, Northern Qi

==== Influence of the Sogdians ====
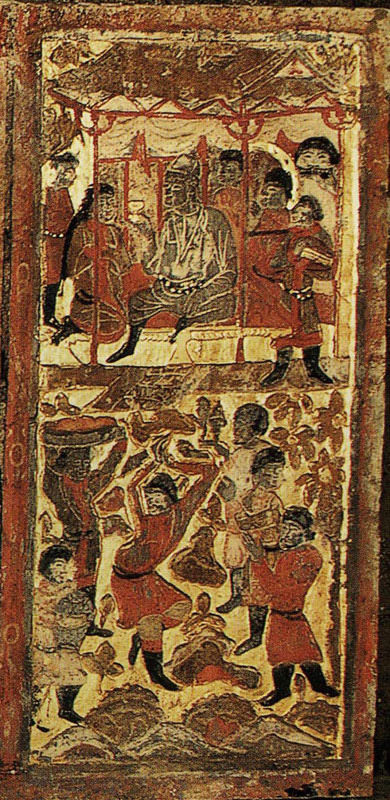
Sogdian wearing their Sogdian-style yuanlingpao, 579 AD

The Sogdians and their descendants, mostly from the merchant class, who lived in China during this period also wore a form of knee-length, yuanling-style kaftan that retained their own ethnic characteristics but also showed some influences from East Asia, including Chinese and early Turkic influences. Due to the influence and the demands of the Chinese population, most Sogdian attire in China had to be closed to the right in the youren-style. Their kaftan would often be buttoned up to the neck, forming a round collar. Occasionally, the collar or lower button would be undone to form lapel robes, a style sometimes referred to as fānlǐngpáo (翻领袍; 'Lapel robe'). This dressing custom of wearing fanlingpao-style robes was later inherited and developed into the yuanlingpao of the subsequent Tang and Sui dynasties.

=== Sui and Tang dynasties, Five Dynasties and Ten Kingdoms period ===
In the Tang dynasty, the descendants of the Xianbei and the other non-Chinese people who ruled northern China from 304 – 581 AD lost their ethnic identity and became Chinese; the term Han referred to all people of the Tang dynasty instead of describing the population ruled by the Xianbei elites during the Northern dynasties.

The yuanlingpao and yuanlingshan, tied with a belt commonly made of leather at the waist, became a typical form of fashion for both men and women during the Tang dynasty, as it was fashionable for women to dress like men in this period. Both garments became the main form of clothing for men as well. Both the yuanlingpao and yuanlingshan of this period had a long, straight back and front with a border at the collar. The front and back of the garments each had a piece of fabric attached for tying the clothing around the waist. The sleeves could be tight or loose, with tight sleeves designed to facilitate ease of movements. Trousers were worn under the yuanlingpao. Some women also wore banbi under their yuanlingpao.

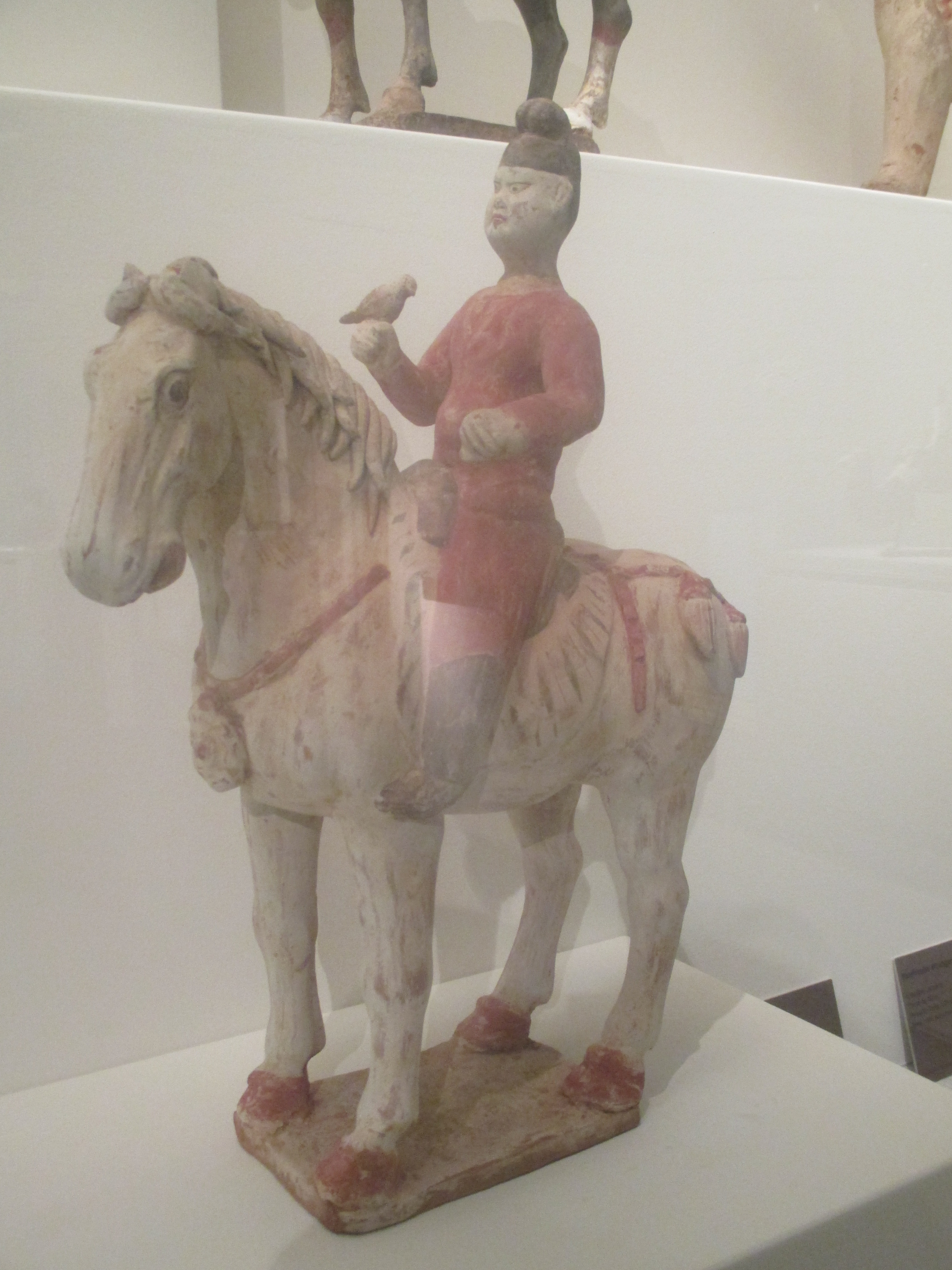
A male rider wearing a yuanlingshan, Tang dynasty

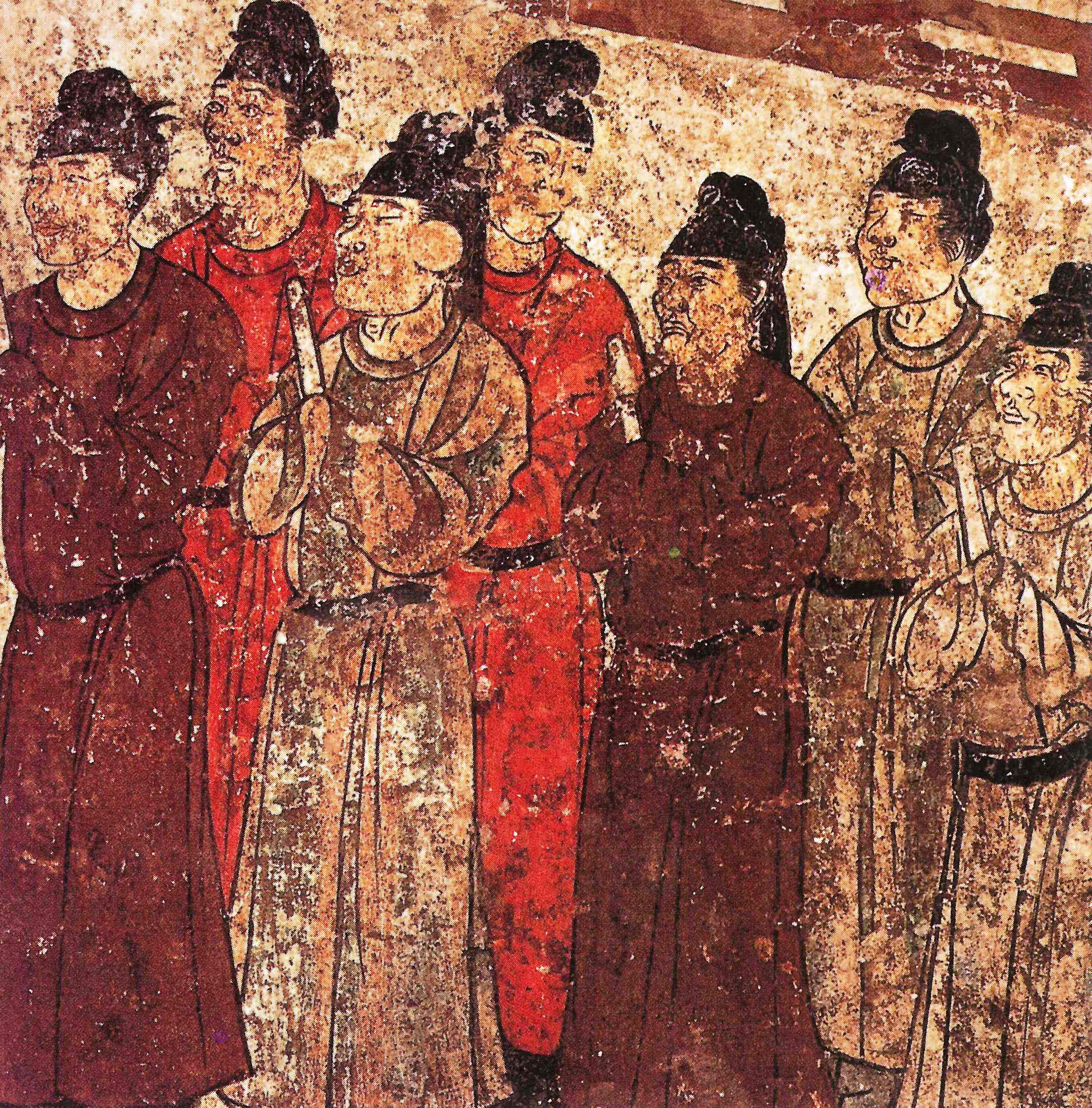
Eunuchs wearing yuanlingpao with loose sleeves, Tang dynasty tomb, 706 AD

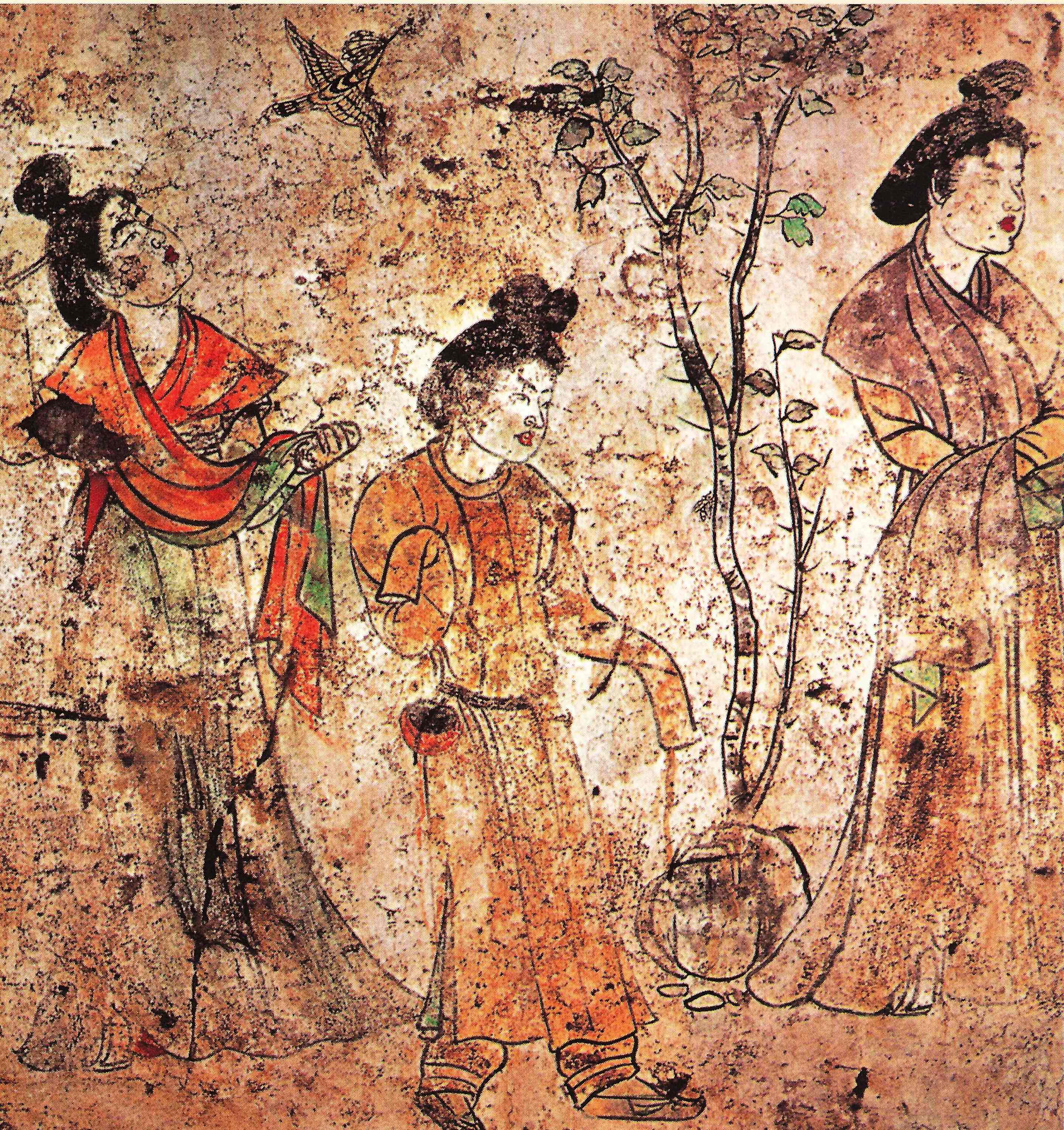
Women (middle and right) wearing yuanlingpao with tight and narrow long sleeves, Tang dynasty tomb, 706 AD

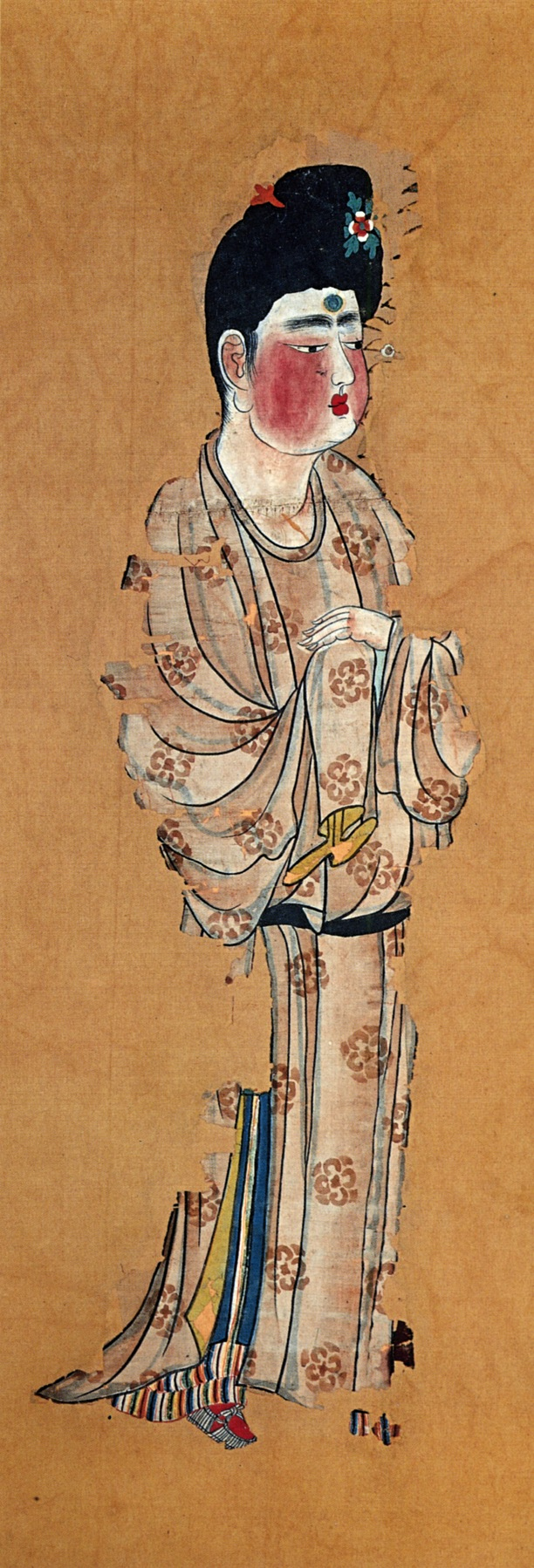
Servant girl wearing a yuanlingpao with loose sleeves, Tang dynasty painting, mid-8th century AD

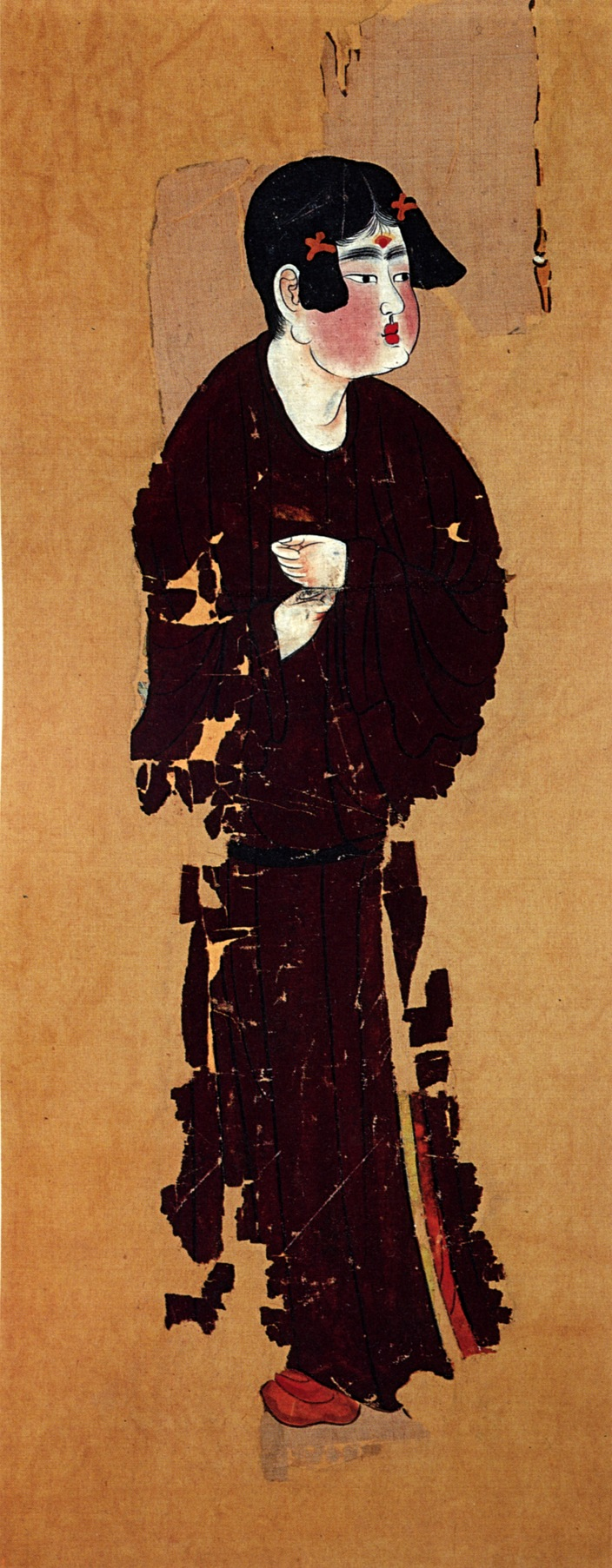
Servant girl with loose sleeves yuanlingpao, Tang dynasty, mid-8th century AD

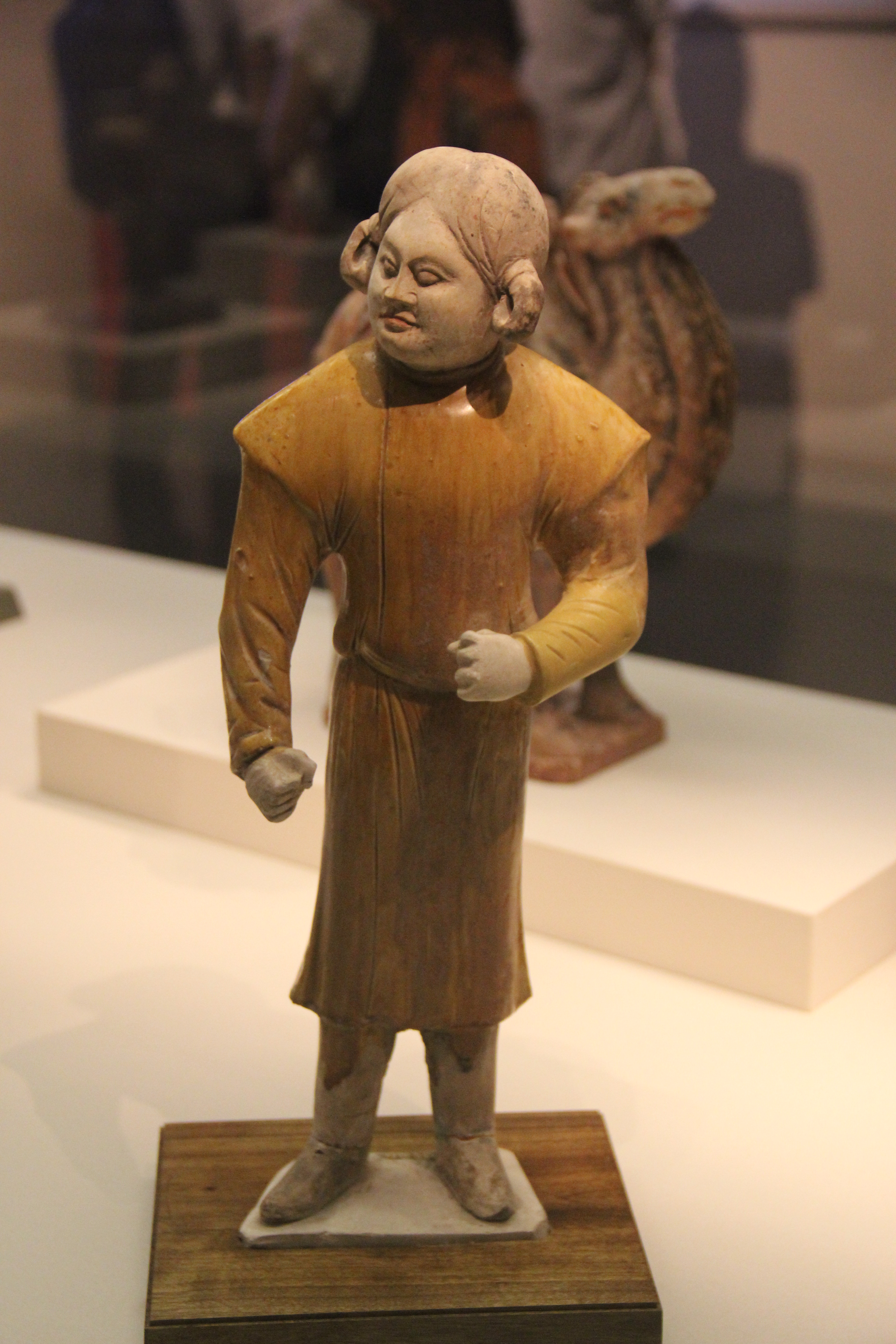
Woman cross-dressing; she is wearing a banbi under her yuanlingpao; Tang dynasty

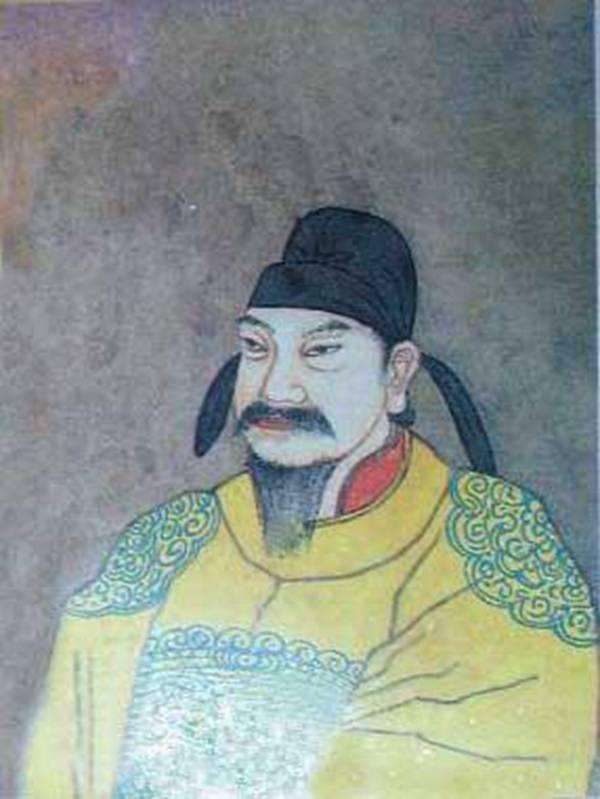
Emperor Yizong of Tang, late Tang dynasty

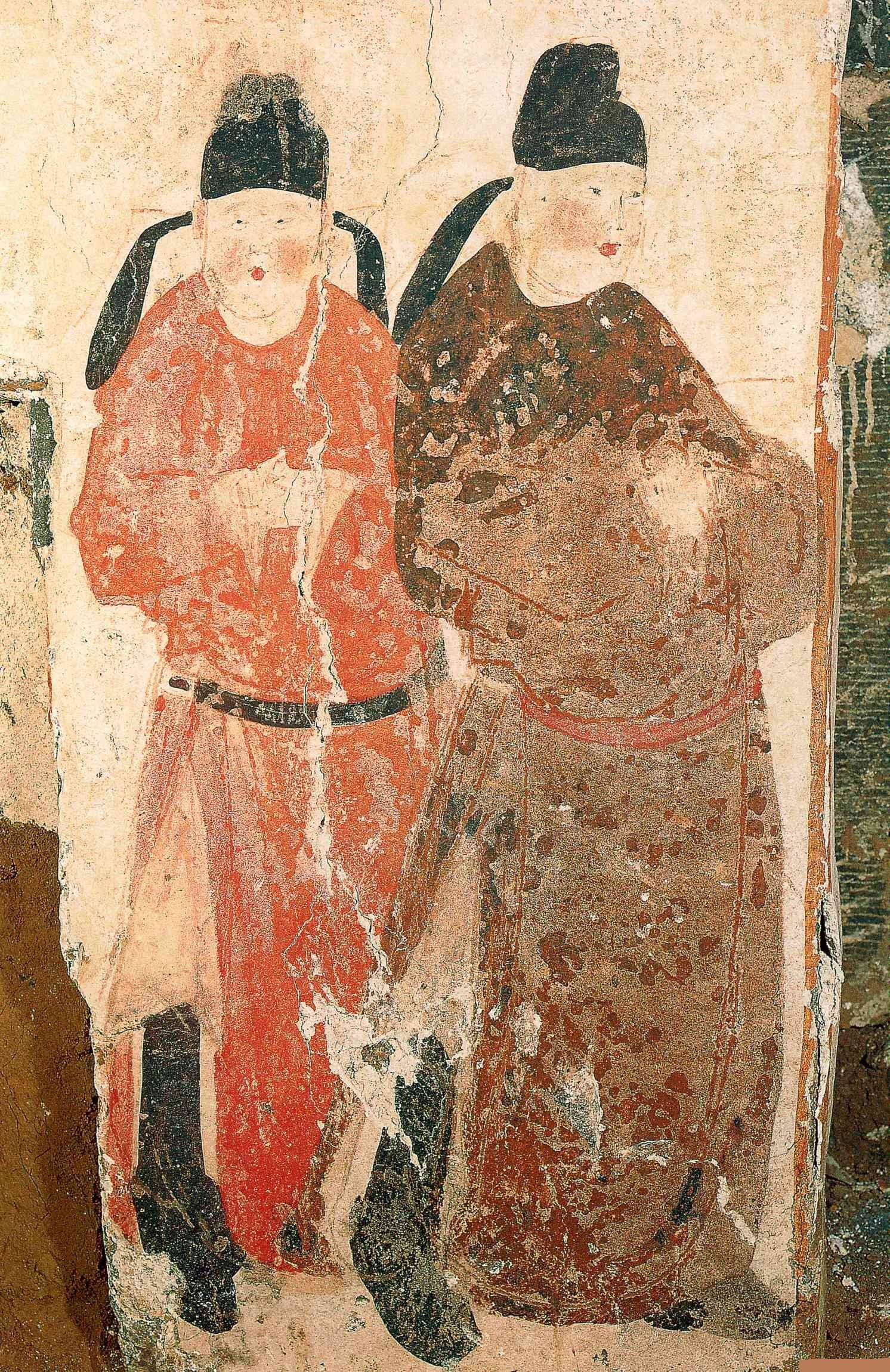
Tomb of Wang Chuzhi, Five Dynasties and Ten Kingdoms period

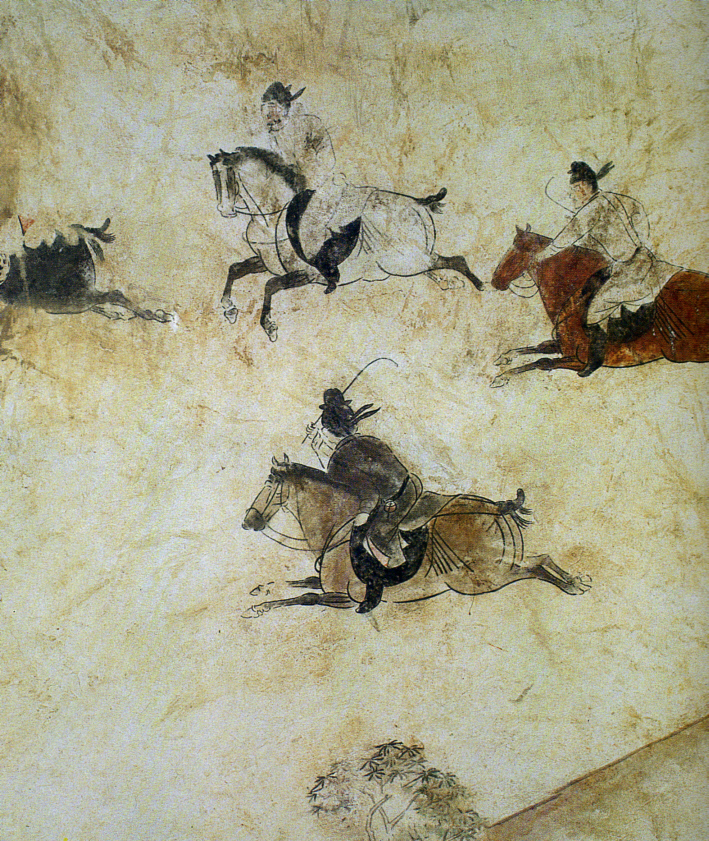
Polo players wearing yuanlingpao with tight sleeves on horseback, Tang dynasty

One distinctive feature of men's clothing during the Tang dynasty was a horizontal band, which could also be attached to the lower region of the yuanlingpao. Tang dynasty scholars and government officials wore long, red panling lanshan with long sleeves, accompanied by headwear called futou. In 630 during the 4th year of Zhen Guan, colour regulations for the panling lanshan of the officials were decreed: purple for the 3rd and 4th rank officials; bright red for the 5th rank officials; green for the 6th and 7th rank officials; and blue for the 8th and 9th officials.In the Kaiyuan era (713 – 741 AD), slaves and the common soldiers also started to wear the scholar's panling lanshan.

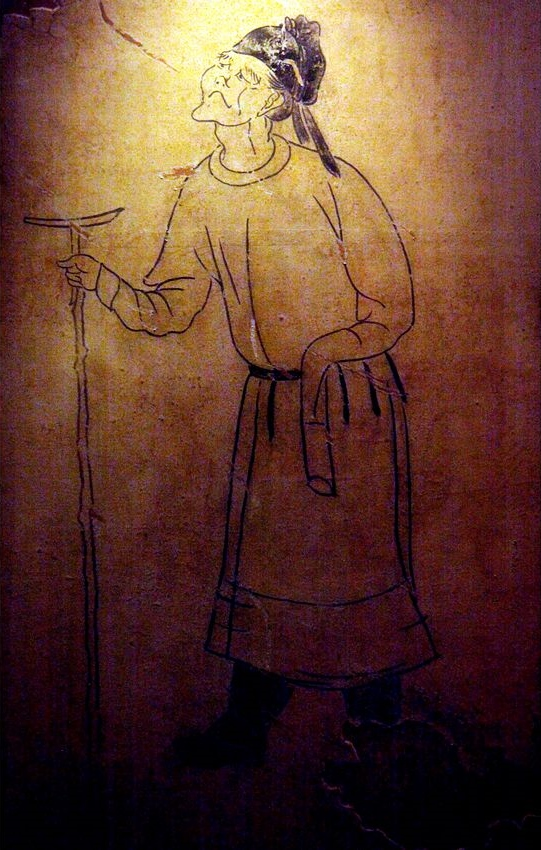
Panling lanshan, Tang dynasty

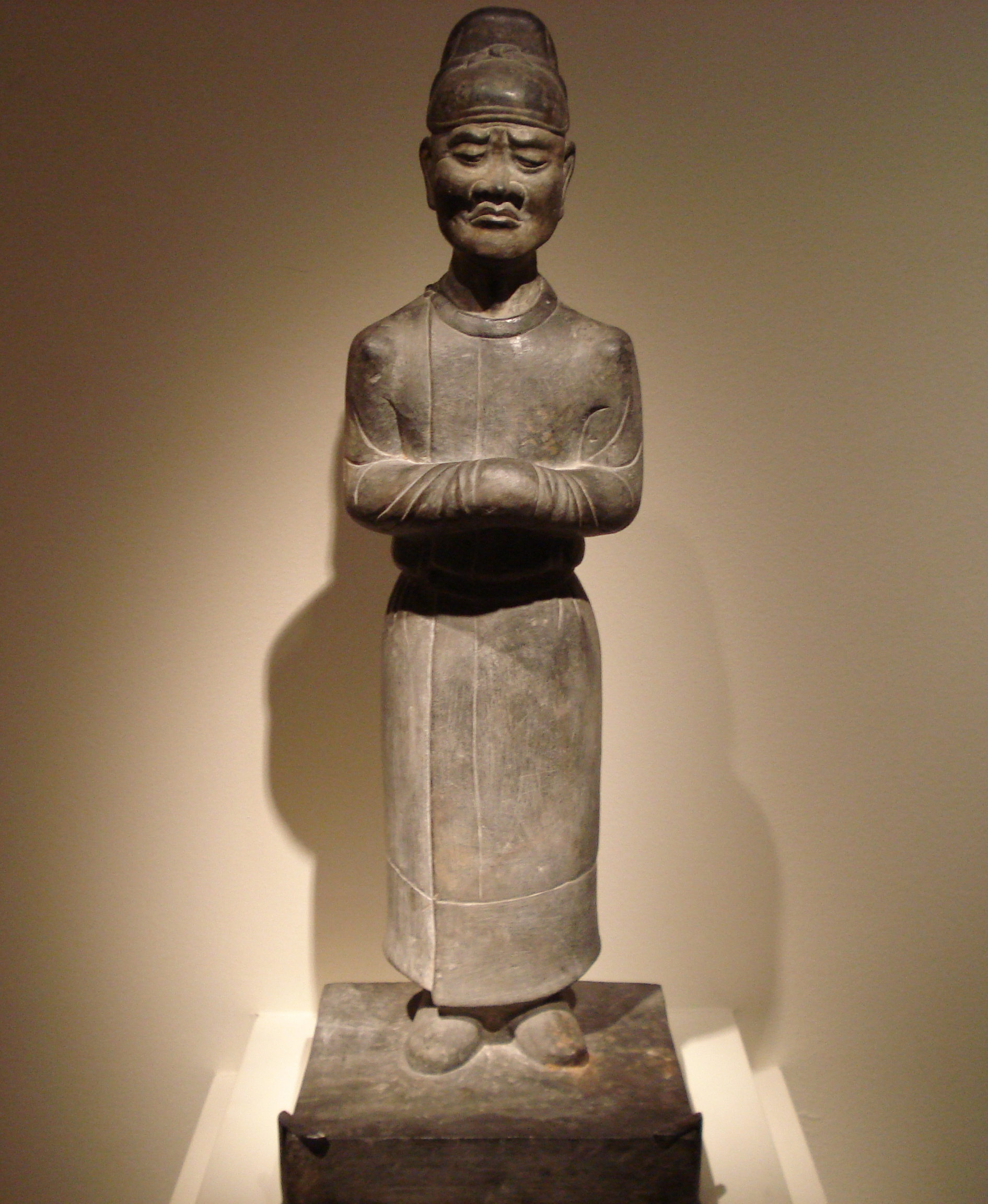
Mourning attendant wearing panling lanshan, Tang dynasty

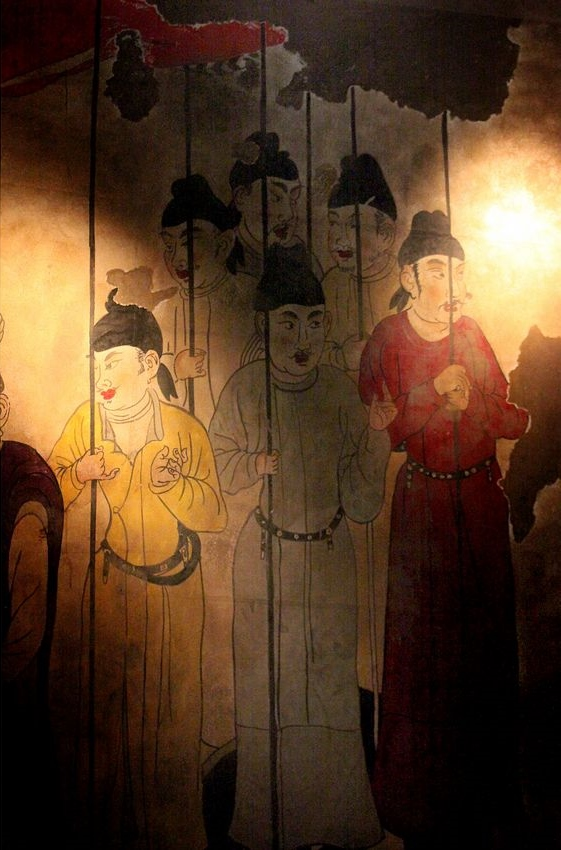
A Tang dynasty man (middle) wearing a panling lanshan, notice the large horizontal band at the bottom of the robe.

==== Foreign influences ====
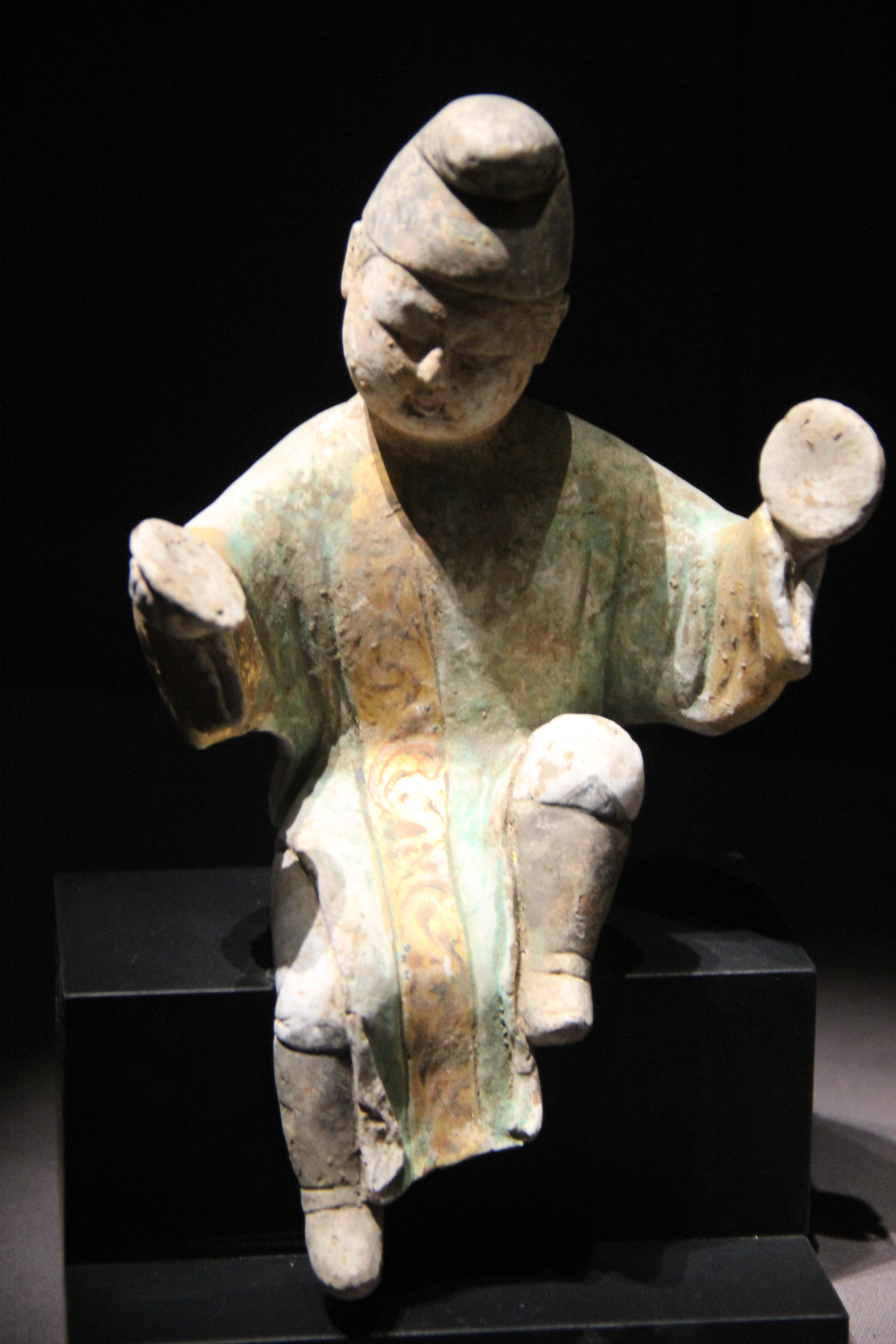
Yuanlingpao decorated with borders (sleeves and front), a Central Asian influence, Tang dynasty

In the Tang dynasty, it was also popular for people to use fabrics, including brocade, to decorate the collars, sleeves and front of the yuanlingpao; this practice of clothing decoration is known as "partial decorations of gowns" and was influenced by the Sogdians of Central Asia, who had entered China since the Northern and Southern dynasties period. Influenced by foreign cultures, some yuanlingpao could have a band of fabric decorated with Central Asian roundels which would run down at the center of the robe as a form of partial decoration.

It was also popular to wear Hufu. Almost all figurines and mural paintings depicting female court attendants dressed in men's clothing are wearing Hufu. The Hufu which was popular in this period was the clothing worn by the Tartars and the people who lived in the Western regions, which was brought from the Silk Road. Robes with double overturned lapels and tight-fitting sleeves were known as kuapao, which originated from Central Asia. During this period, the yuanlingpao could be turned into a fanlingpao under the influence of Hufu by unbuttoning the robes, while the fanlingpao could be also be turned back into a yuanlingpao when buttoned. In some unearthed pottery figures wearing fanlingpao dating from the Tang dynasty, it was found that the yuanlingpao had three buttons on the collar. After the High Tang dynasty period, the influences of Hufu progressively started to fade and the clothing started to become increasingly loose.

=== Song dynasty ===
During the Song dynasty, the official attire worn by Song court officials was the yuanlingpao with long, loose and broad sleeves. The colours of the yuanlingpao were also regulated based on the official's ranks. The yuanlingpao had a large overlapping region being held down by a broad strip of fabricand a long line which divided the front part of the gown. Kerchief (typically futou), leather belt, and yudai (魚袋; 'fish-bag'), black hide boots or shoes, would be worn by the court officials as accessories.

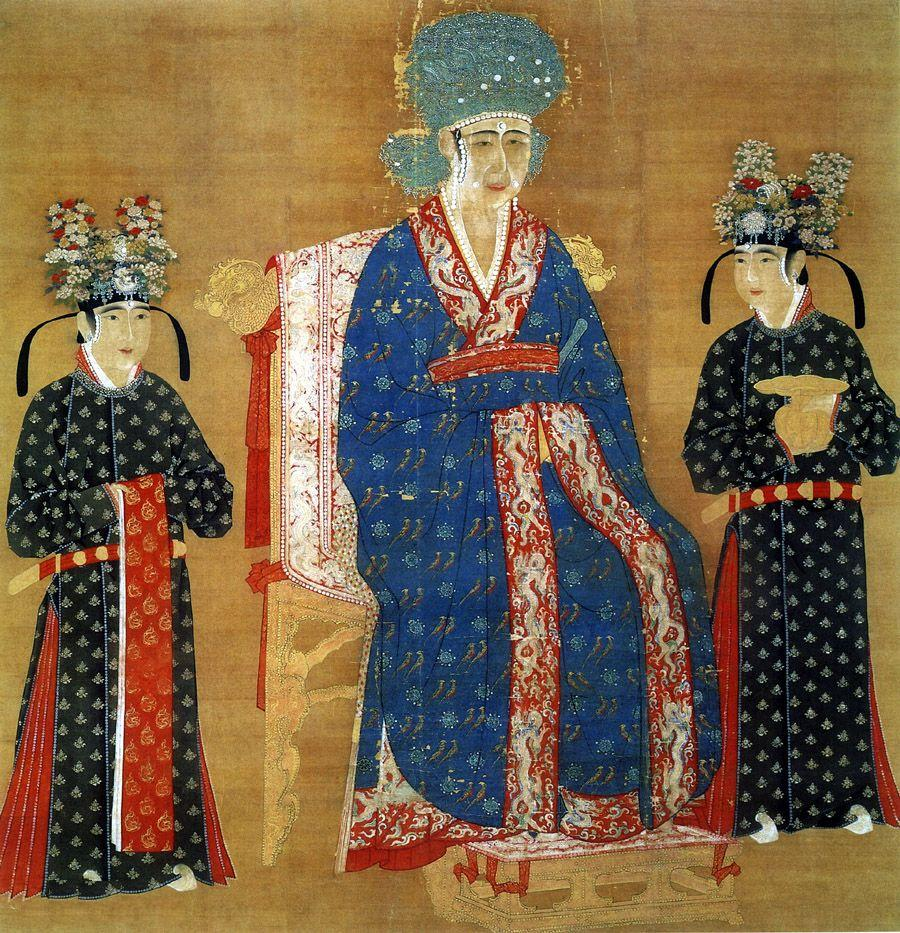
Maids of a Song dynasty empress wearing yuanlingpao

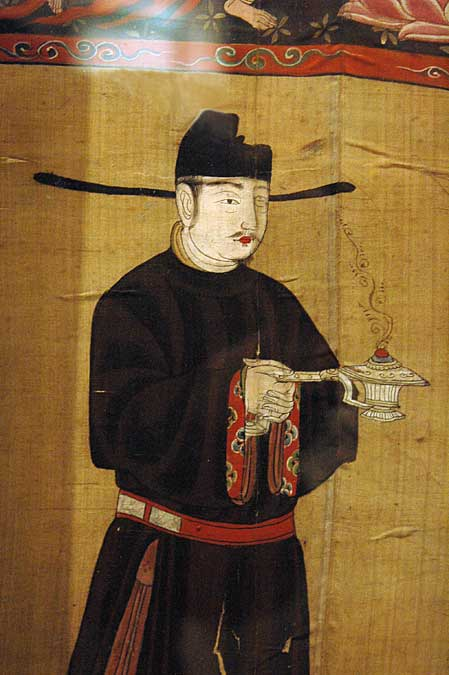
Northern Song Male Buddhist donor with a loose-sleeved dark yuanlingpao

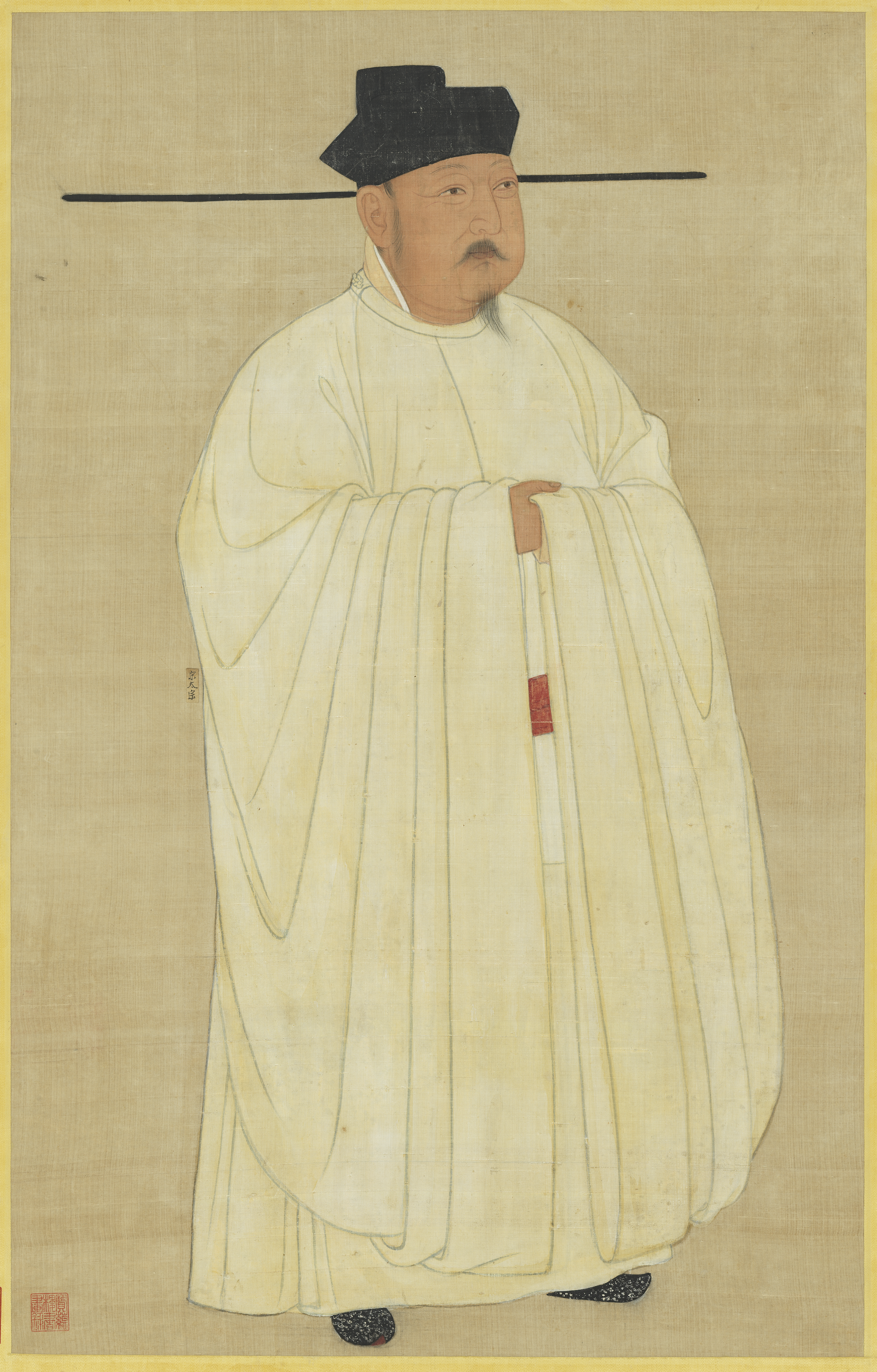
Emperor Taizong of Song wearing a very large-sleeved yuanlingpao

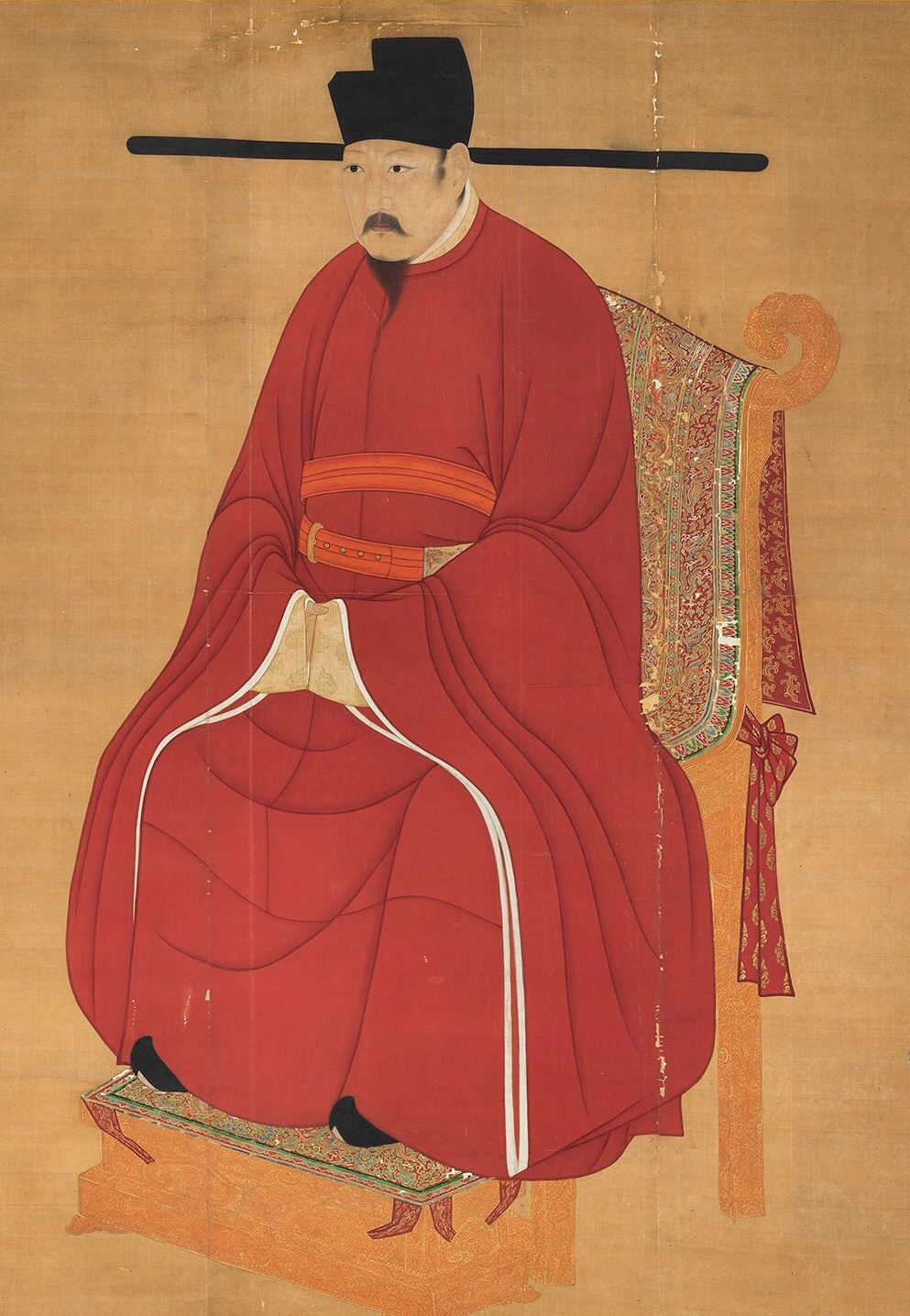
Emperor Renzong of Song wearing a very large-sleeved yuanlingpao

=== Liao, Jin and Western Xia dynasties ===
==== Liao dynasty ====
Khitan men wore the Khitan-style yuanlingpao with a belt at their waist and trousers tucked into felt boots. The Khitan-style yuanlingpao differed from those worn by the Han Chinese in terms of design and construction: the Khitan-style yuanlingpao had both back and side slits, with the side slits located in the lower region of the robes. The back slits facilitated horse-riding and protected wearers' legs from the cold. Some of them had no slits. The Khitan-style yuanlingpao also had narrow sleeves, was closed on the left side, and was unadorned.

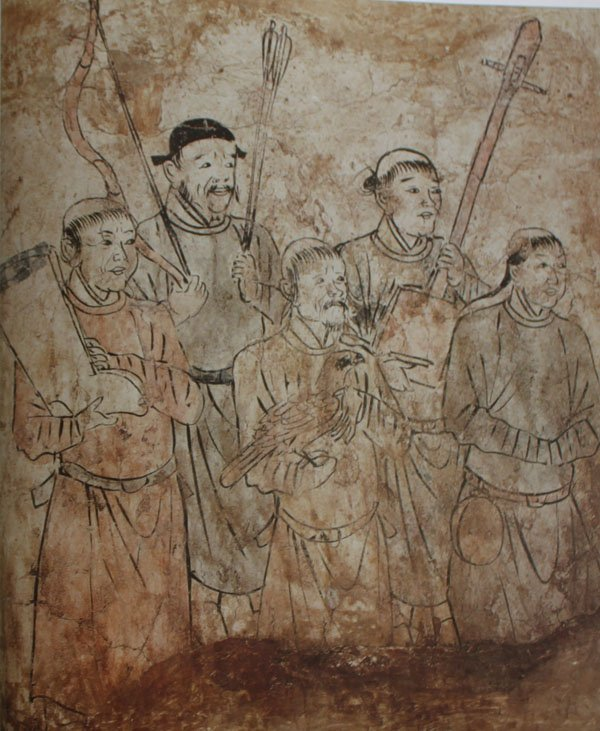
Khitan men wearing tight-sleeved yuanlingpao, Liao dynasty

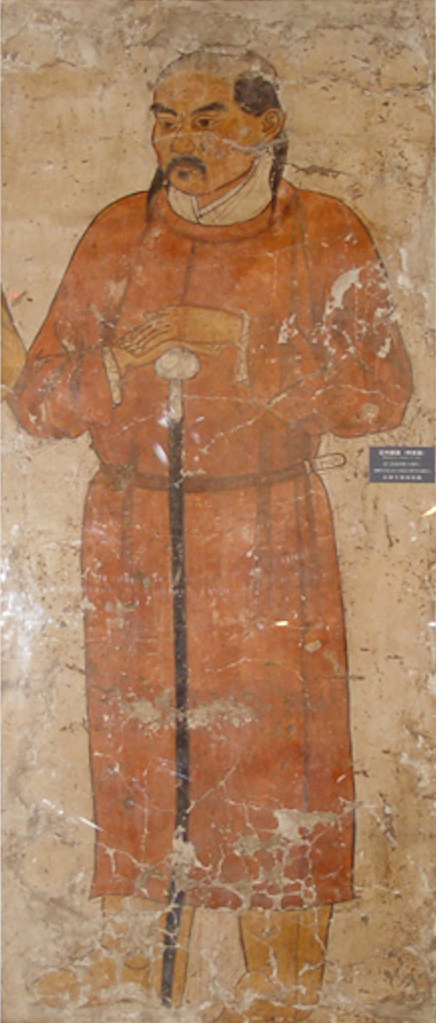
A Khitan guard wearing tight-sleeved yuanlingpao, Liao dynasty.

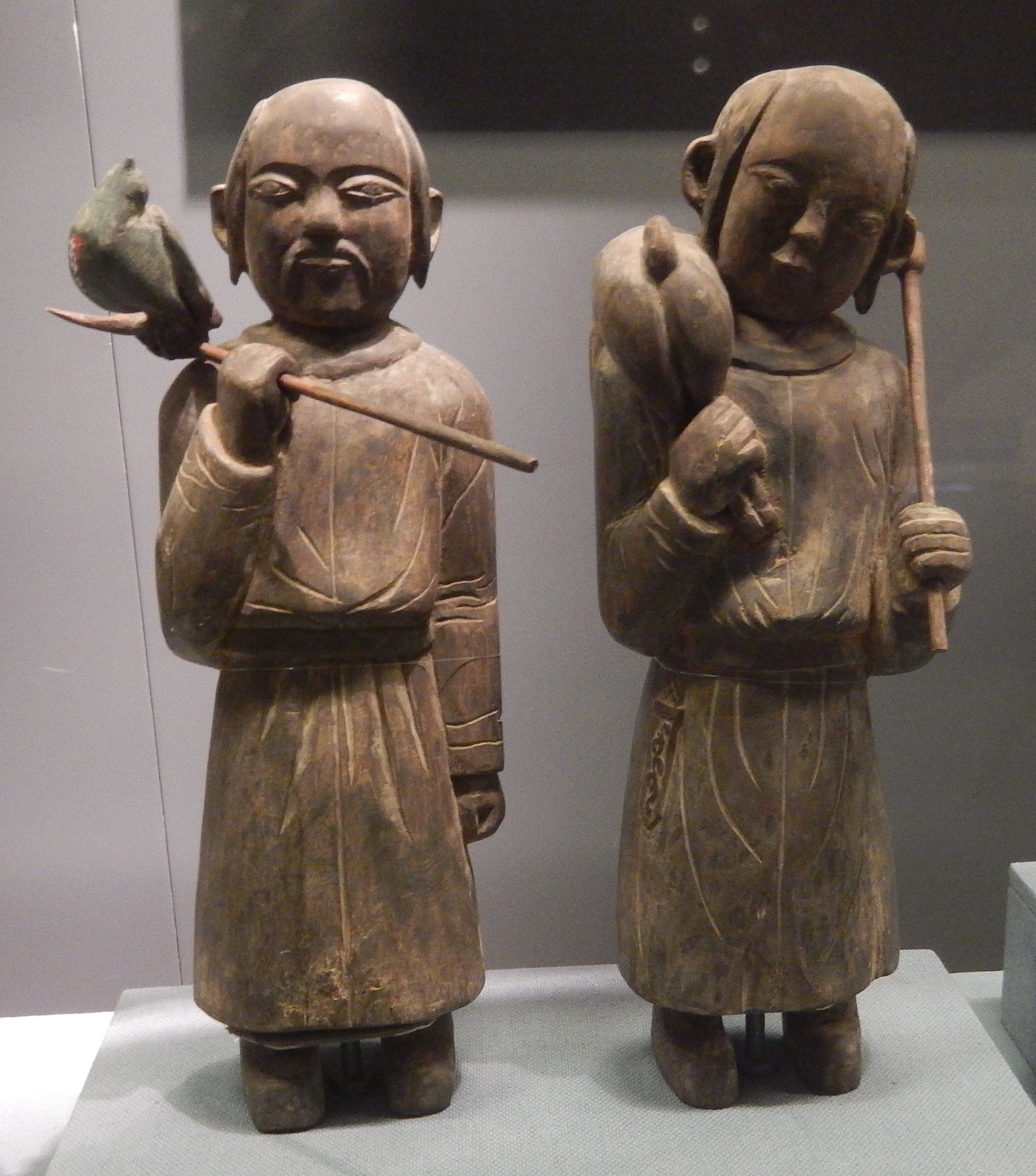
Khitan men wearing tight-sleeved yuanlingpao

==== Jin dynasty ====
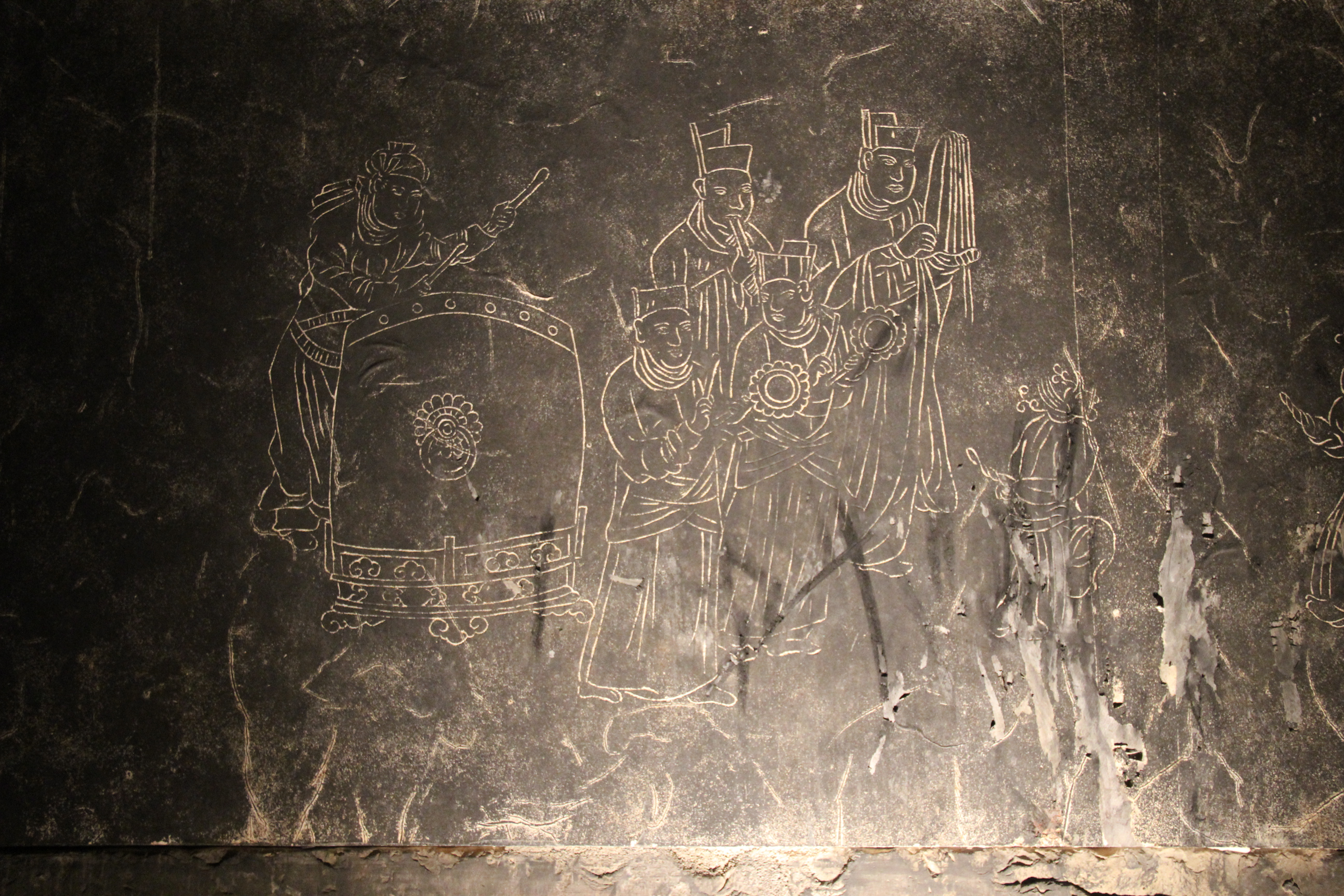
Men wearing yuanlingpao, Jurchen Jin dynasty

==== Western Xia ====
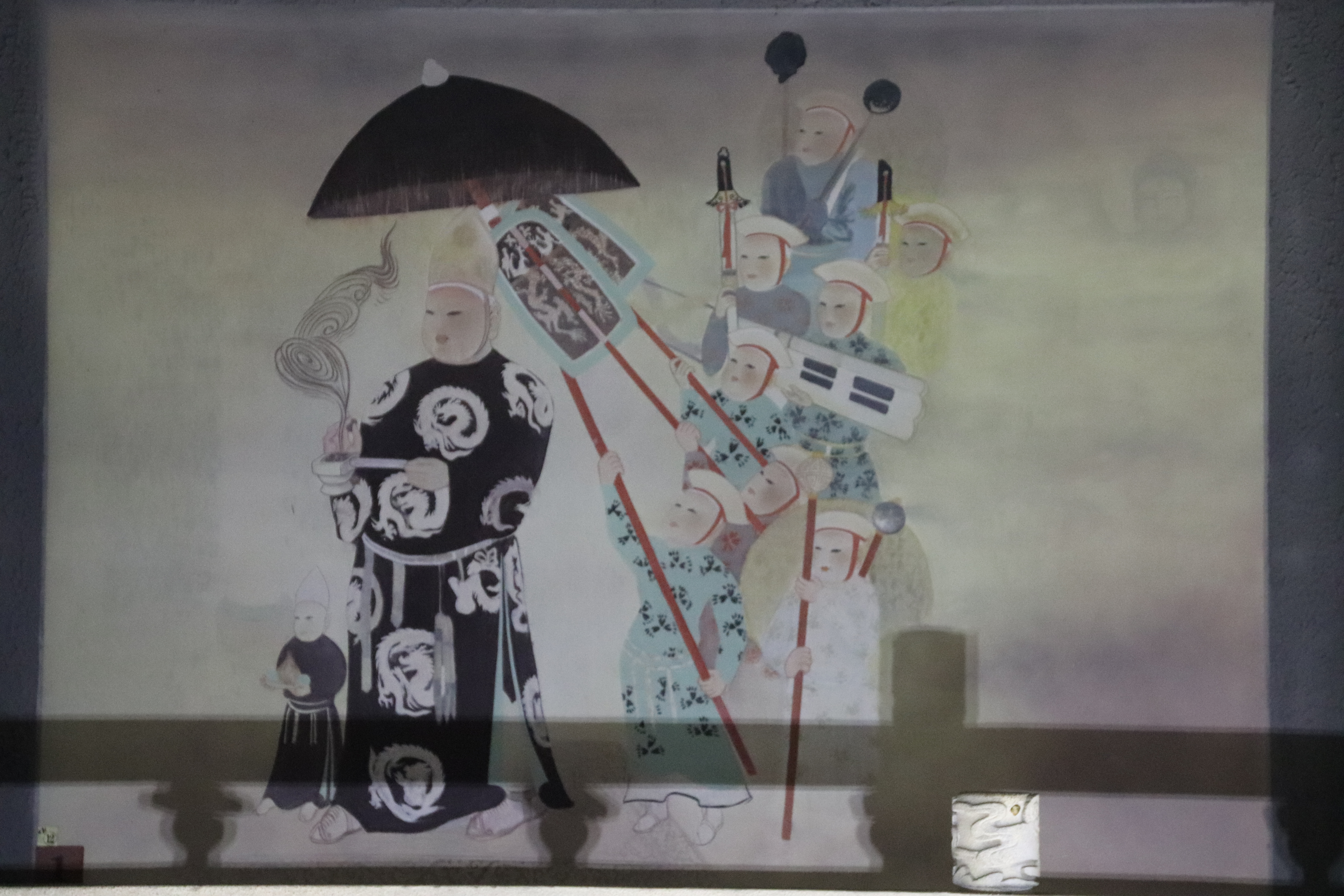
Men wearing round collar robes, Western Xia mural

Western Xia men wearing tight-sleeved yuanlingpao

=== Ming dynasty ===
After the establishment of the Ming dynasty, the emperor restored the old system of the Tang and Song dynasties. During the Ming dynasty, the yuanlingpao and yuanlingshan were also the most common form of attire for all genders, including officials and nobles. The yuanlingpao and/or yuanlingshan were not typically worn alone; a sleeveless vest called dahu and an inner robe (either the tieli or zhishen) was commonly worn underneath.

The difference between the yuanlingpao or yuanlingshan of the civilians and of the officials and nobles was the addition of a buzi (either a mandarin square or roundels rank badge) and the fabric materials used. (Note: In the Ming dynasty, officials were silk or leno silk. The ordinary civilians however wore coarse clothing made of cotton and linen.) The clothing of the Ming dynasty was predominantly red, although, there were strict colour regulations depending on the ranks of officials. (Note: According to the Ming dynasty regulations officials ranking from the 1st to 4th grades wore red; the 5th to 7th wore green, and the 8th to 9th also wore green.) During an Imperial Funeral, Ming officers wore a grey-blue yuanlingshan without a Mandarin square, wūjiǎodài (烏角帶; 'black horn belt') and wushamao. This set was known as Qingsufu (青素服).

The Ming dynasty yuanlingpao and yuanlingshan were typically characterized by the "cross-plane structure", with the back and front being bounded by the middle seam of the sleeves. The front and back were symmetrical and the left and right were also largely symmetrical; there is a central line acting as the axis of this symmetry. It has a round collar without a high-standing collar which is secured with a button; it overlaps on the front side and closes at the right side in the youren-style, which follows the traditional Hanfu system. It also has side slits on the right and left side. The sleeves of the yuanlingshan are mostly in a style called pípáxiù (琵琶袖; 'pipa sleeves'), which means the sleeves are large but curved to form a narrow sleeve cuff, to facilitate movements and be more practical in daily life. Men's yuanlingpao and yuanlingshan also have side panels called ànbǎi (暗擺; 'hidden pendulum') at the side slits to conceal the undergarments. These side panels are also referred to as "side ears" which are unique to the Ming dynasty's yuanlingpao; this specific structure reflects the combination of Hanfu and attire of the Mongols, the ethnic minority. The "side ear" also allows for greater ease of movement and can increase the looseness of the robe.

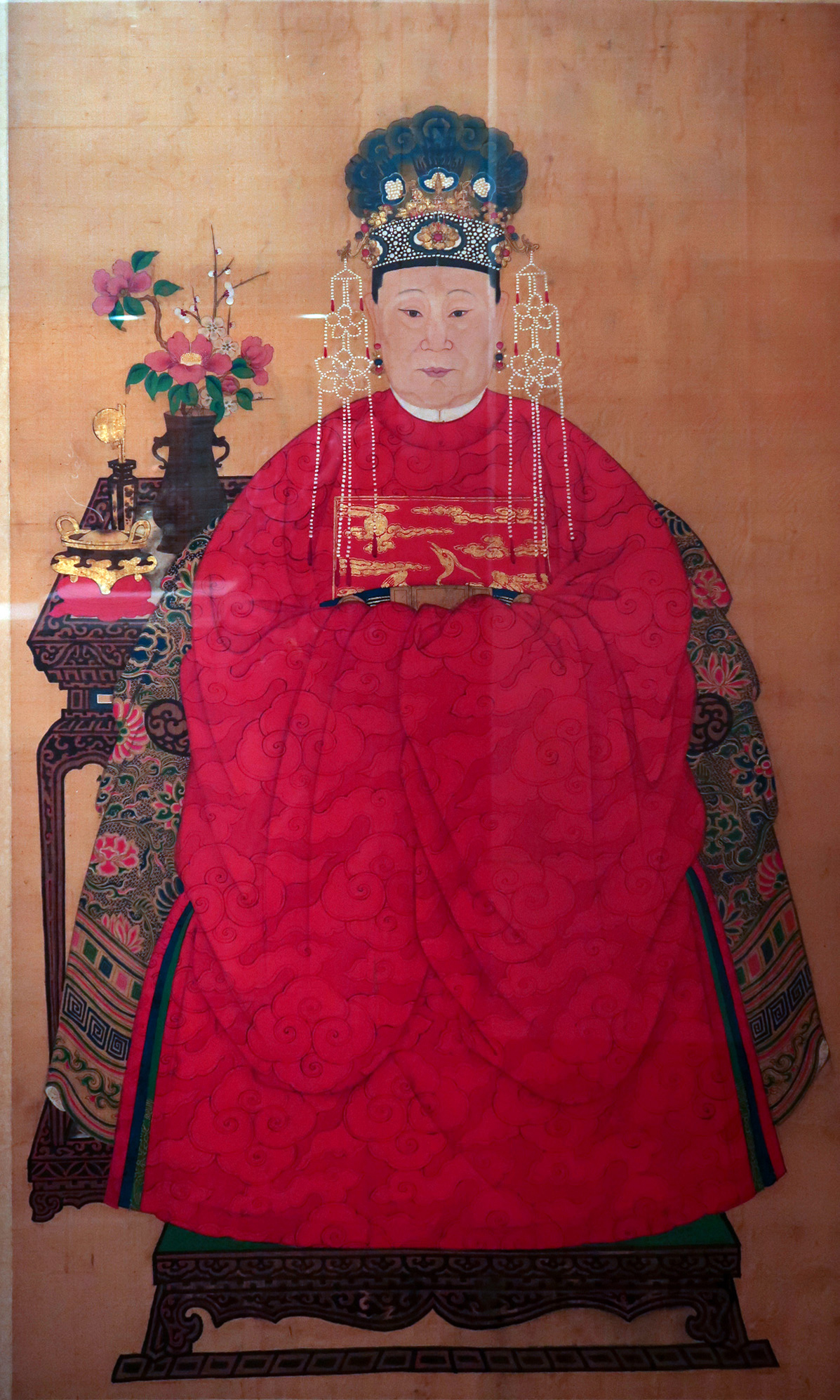
A noblewomen's yuanlingpao, Ming dynasty

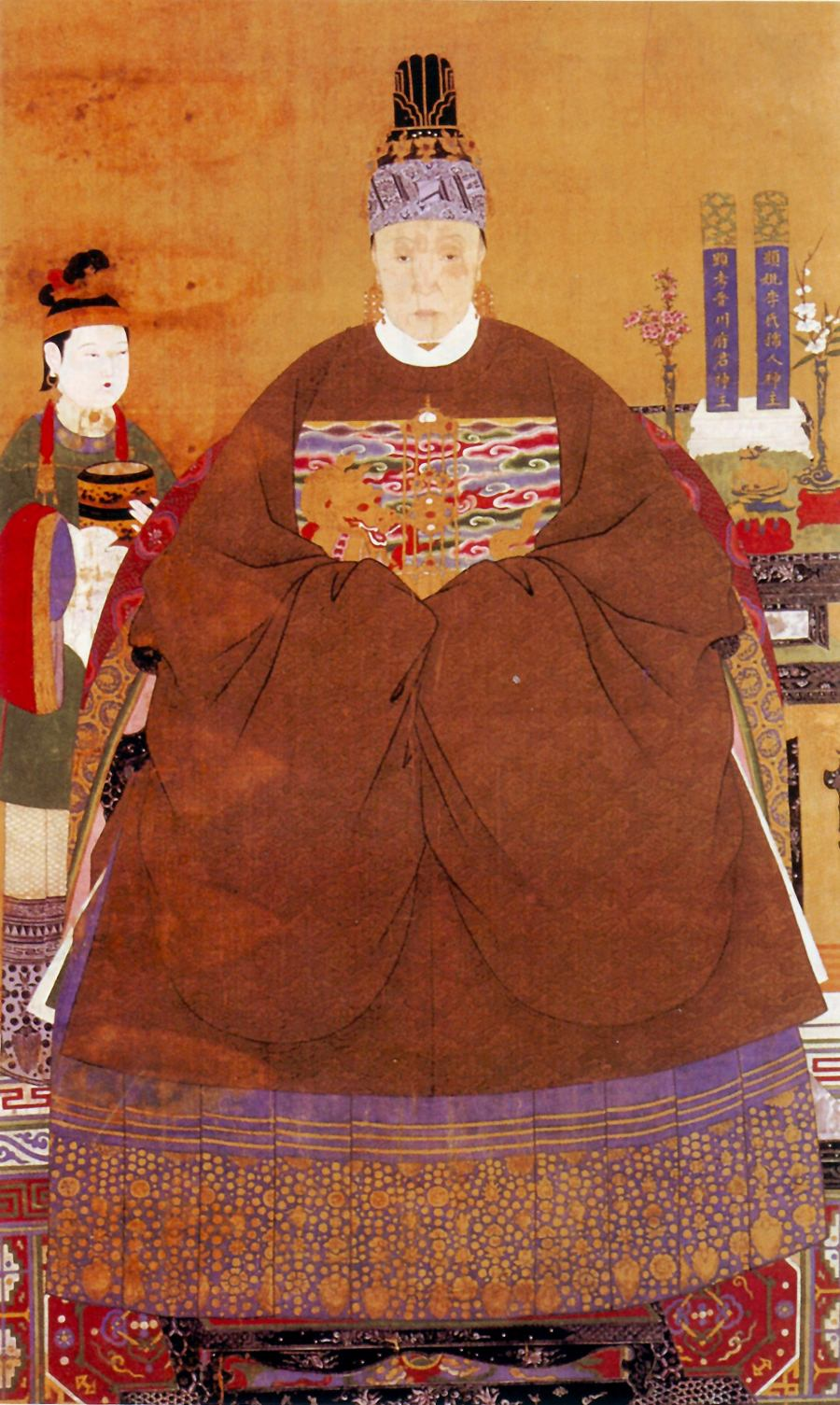

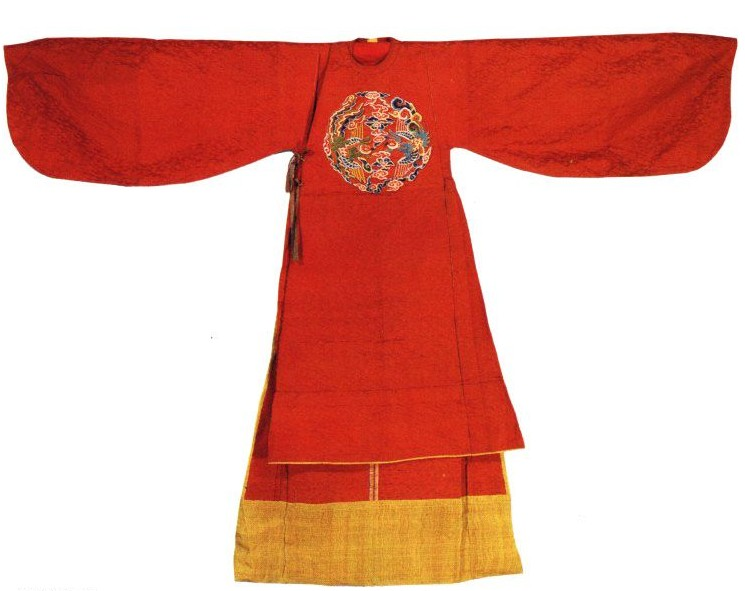
Unearthed Ming dynasty artefact

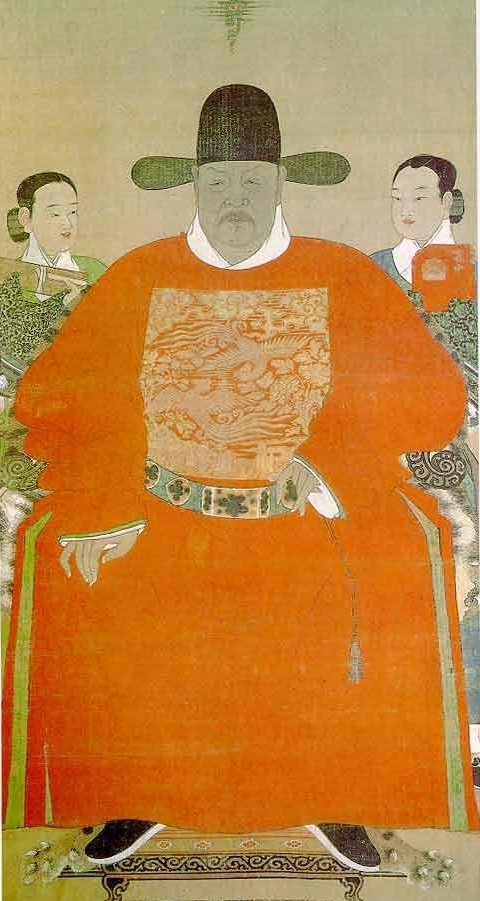
Ming dynasty court official

Ming Emperor wearing round-collar robes decorated with dragon roundels. This form of dress is called the longpao (i.e., the dragon robes).

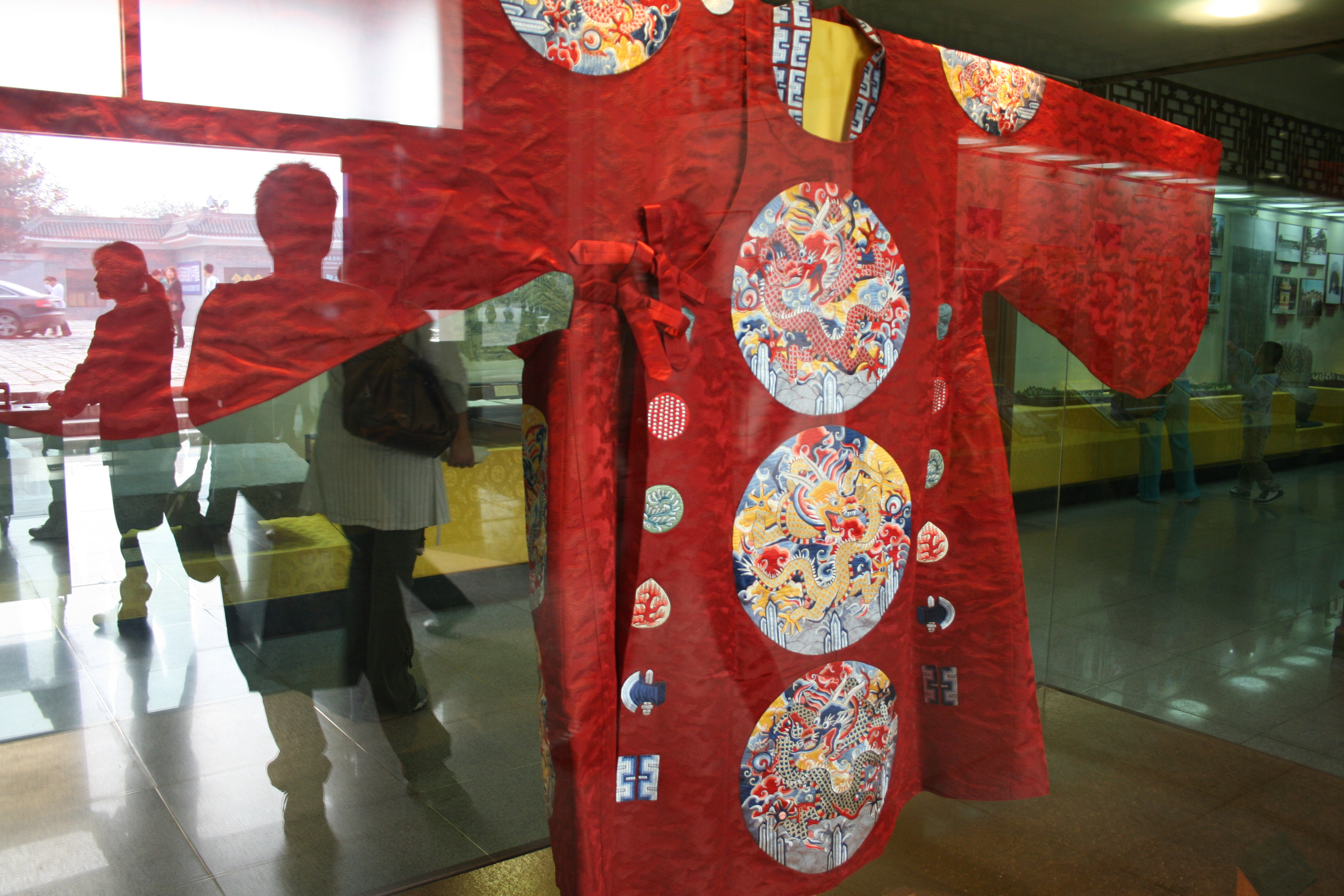
Round collared robe, from the Tomb of Emperor Wanli, Ming dynasty

=== Qing dynasty ===
During the Qing dynasty, the Manchu rulers enforced the tifayifu policy along with 10 exemptions. Among the exempted people were the Han Chinese women, who were allowed to continue wearing the Ming-style Hanfu, and on-stage theatre performers. While qizhuang was worn in the dominant sphere of society - ritual and official locations, Hanfu continued to be worn in the subordinate societal sphere, such as in women's quarters and theatres.

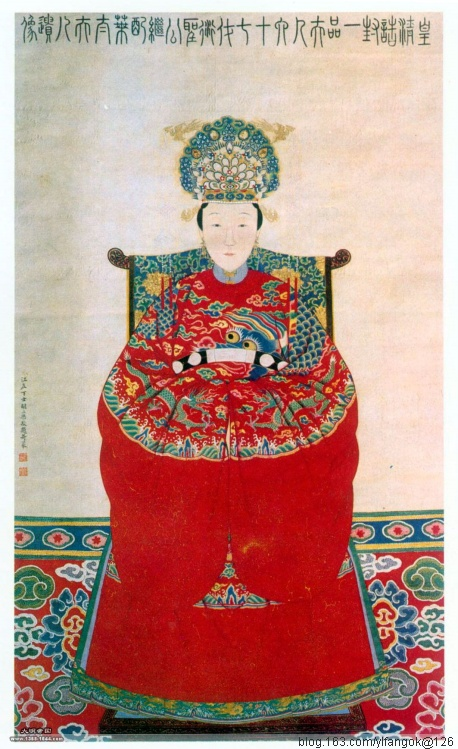

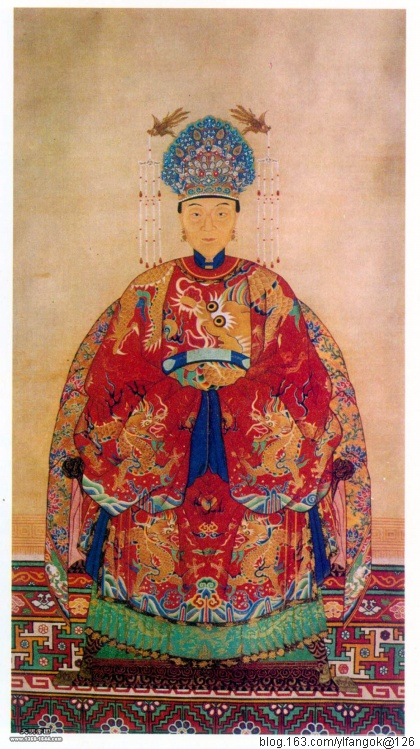

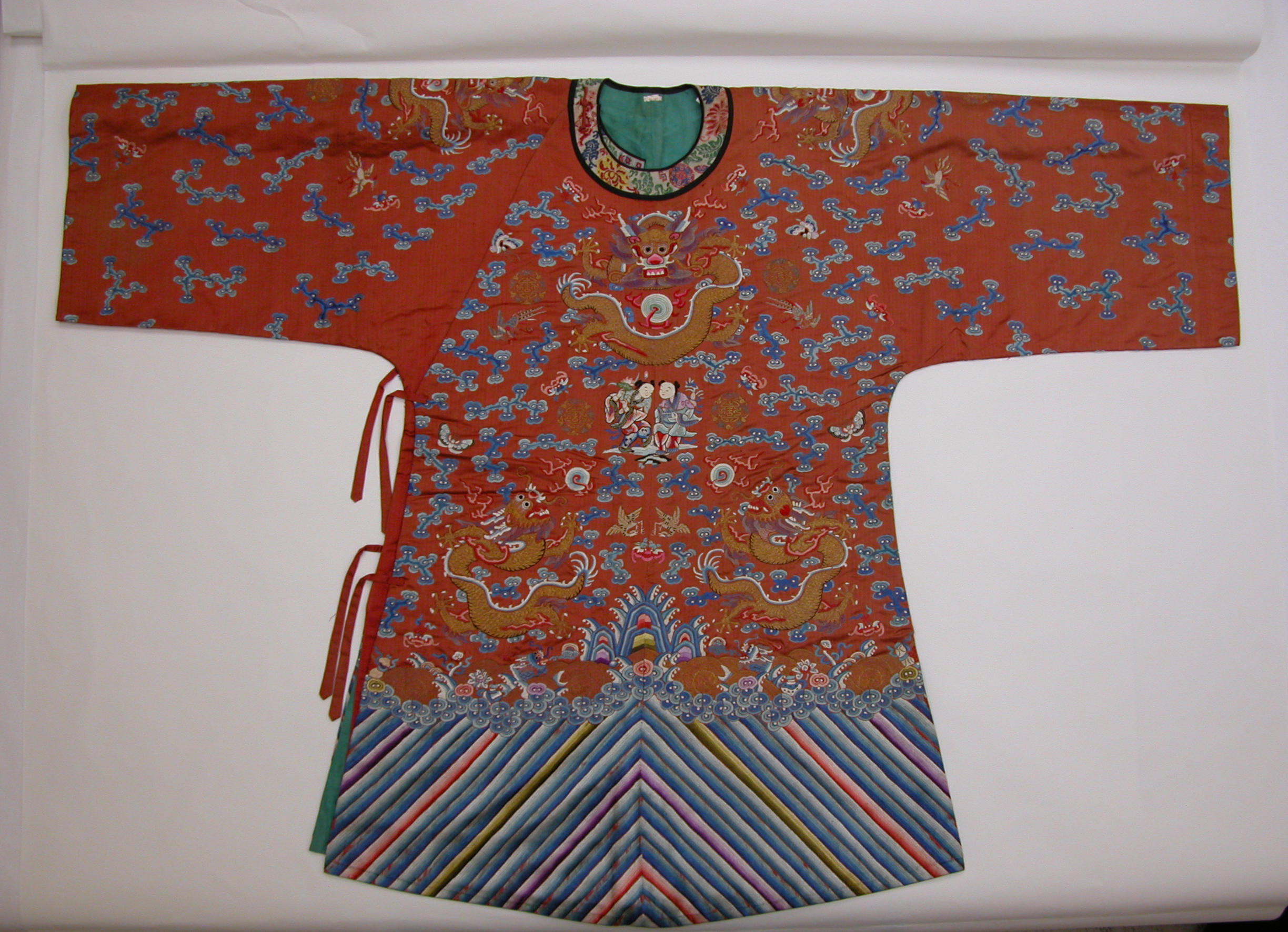
Yuanlingpao (court robe), Qing dynasty, 19th century

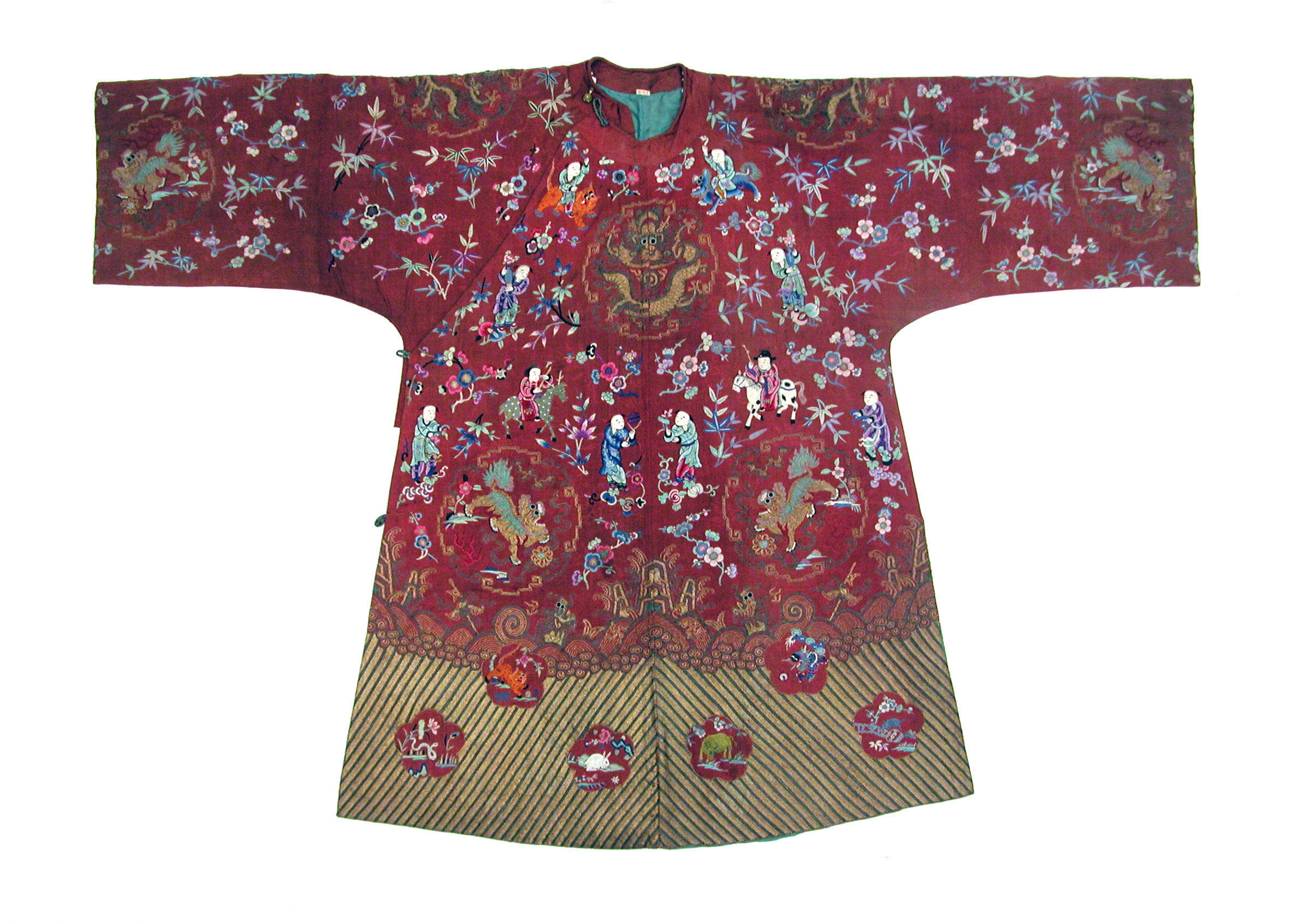
A woman's wedding yuanlingshan, also known as mangao, closes with buttons on the right side. It was typically worn together with a skirt known as mangchu.

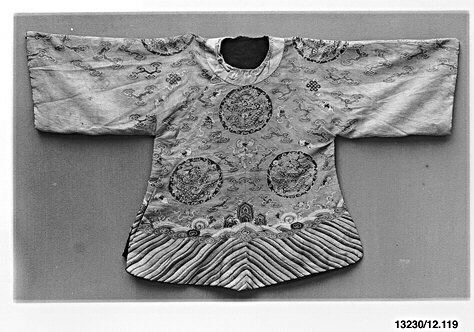
A child's yuanlingpao, 19th century

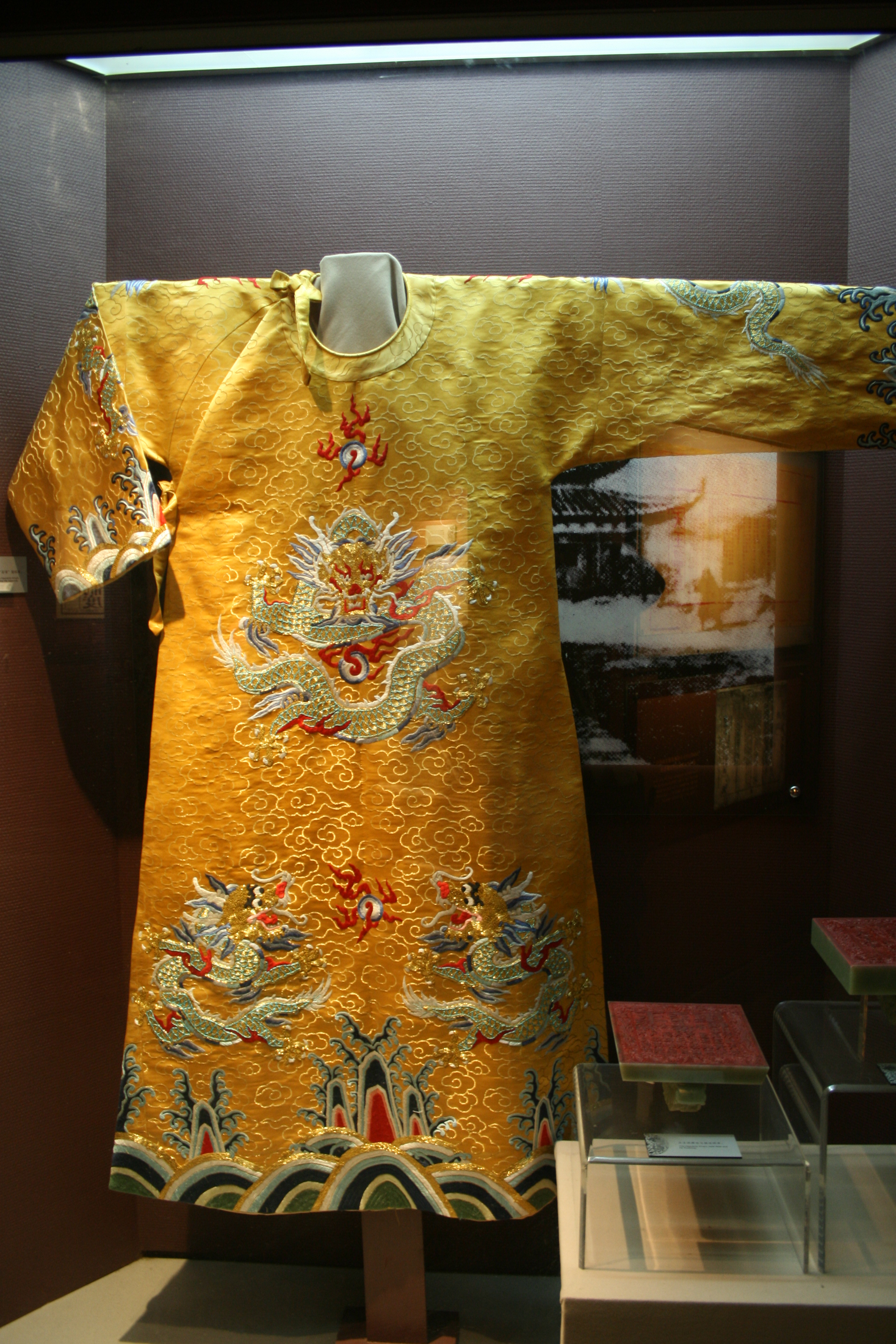
Hong Xiuquan's silk Dragon robe

== Wedding garment ==
The yuanlingpao of officials and nobles also served as a form of wedding attire for commoners. The groom wears a type of headwear known as wushamao and a yuanlingpao of a 9th-rank official. The bride wears a type of headwear known as fengguan and a red yuanlingpao or yuanlingshan with a xiapei of a noblewoman.

== Influence and derivatives ==
=== Korea ===
==== Dallyeong ====
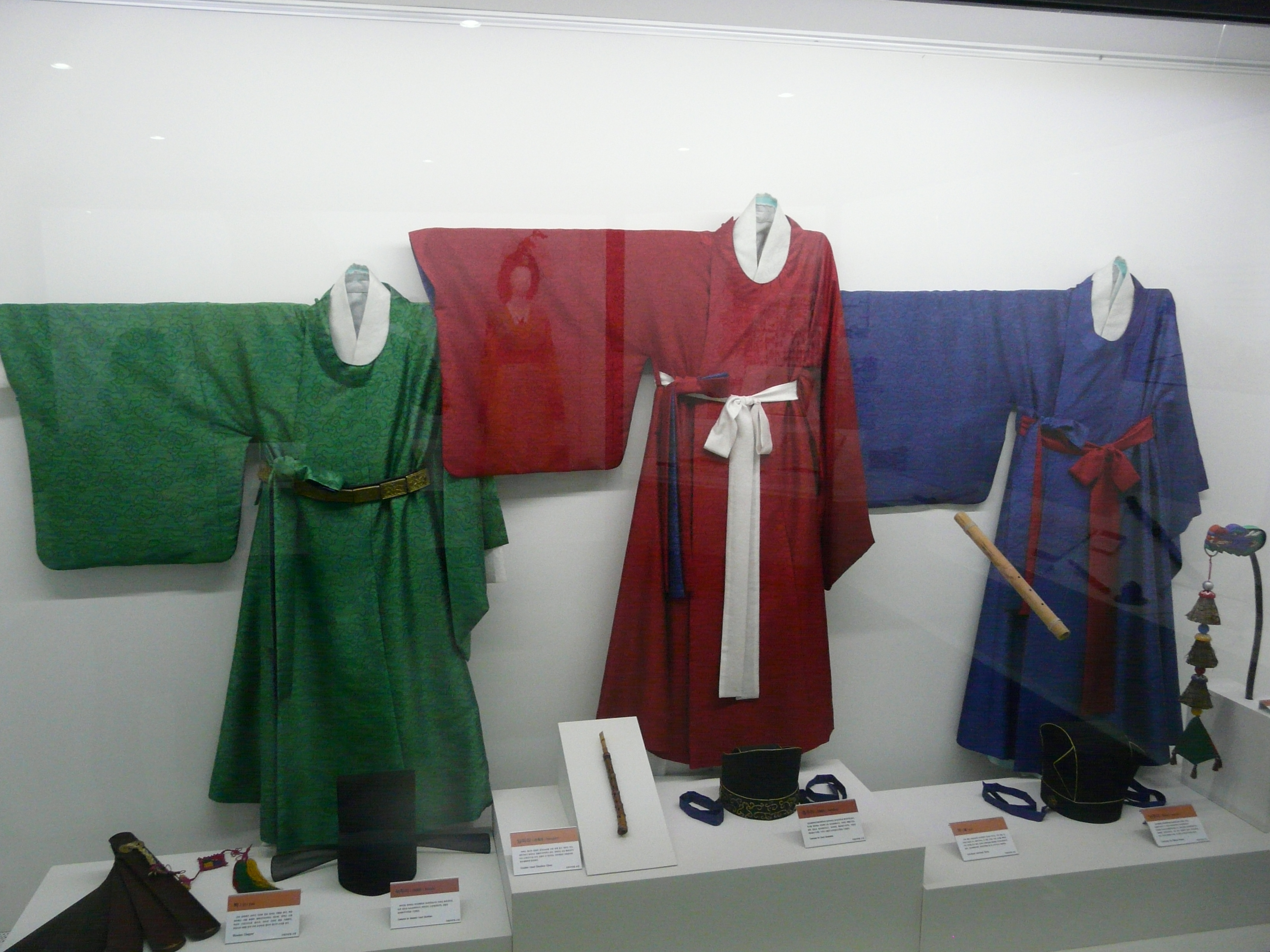
Three dallyeong from the Museum of Traditional Korean Music, Korea

In Korea, the yuanlingpao was introduced during the Tang dynasty and became known as the dallyeong (Korean: 단령; Hanja: 團領; RR: danryeong; Korean pronunciation: [daɭjʌoŋ]). During the rule of Queen Jindeok of Silla, Kim Chunchu personally travelled to the Tang dynasty to request for clothing and belts and voluntarily accepted the official uniform system of the Tang dynasty, which included the dallyeong among many other clothing items. Since then, the dallyeong continued to be worn until the end of Joseon. In the late Goryeo period, under the reign of King U, the dallyeong was adopted as an official gwanbok when the official uniform system of the Ming dynasty was imported.

==== Wonsam ====
The initial shape of the wonsam worn by women from the 15th to 16th century was similar to the dallyeong and included the use of a collar which was similar to the dallyeong-style collar.

=== Japan ===
In Japan, the formal court attire for men and women was established by the start of the 8th century and was based on the court attire of the Tang dynasty. The round collared robe called ho in the Sokutai (束帯), which was worn by the Japanese Emperors, and the noblemen, was adopted from the yuanlingpao.

According to the Ming dynasty's Government letter against Toyotomi Hideyoshi, the Ming Government bestowed on him a set of changfu (常服羅) containing a red yuanlingpao with qilin mandarin square (大紅織金胷背麒麟圓領), a dark blue dahu (青褡護), and a green tieli (綠貼裏).

=== Vietnam ===
==== Áo viên lĩnh ====
According to the book Weaving a realm by the Vietnam Center, the áo viên lĩnh (chữ Hán: 襖圓領), a 4-long flap robe with a round neck, was imported to Vietnam from China. However, this fashion gradually faded away from their daily lives due to the clothing reforms decreed by the Nguyen lords.

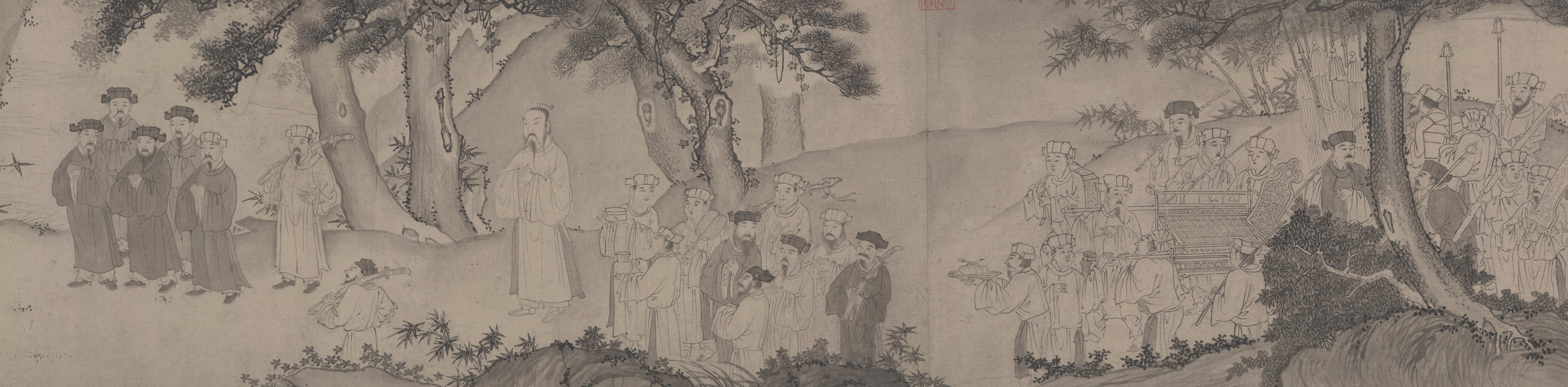
Men wearing áo viên lĩnh, painting from The Mahasattva Trúc Lâm Coming Out of the Mountains, 1363

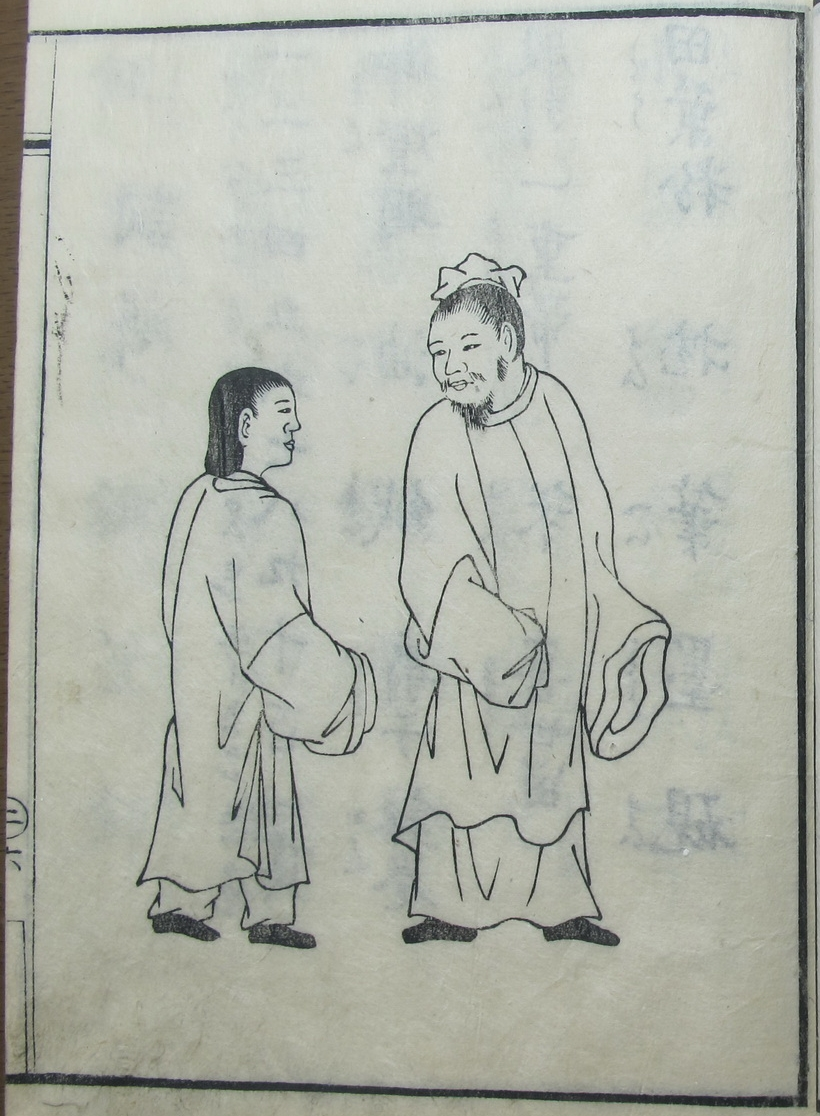
Áo viên lĩnh of Vietnamese people in Đàng Trong, 1675

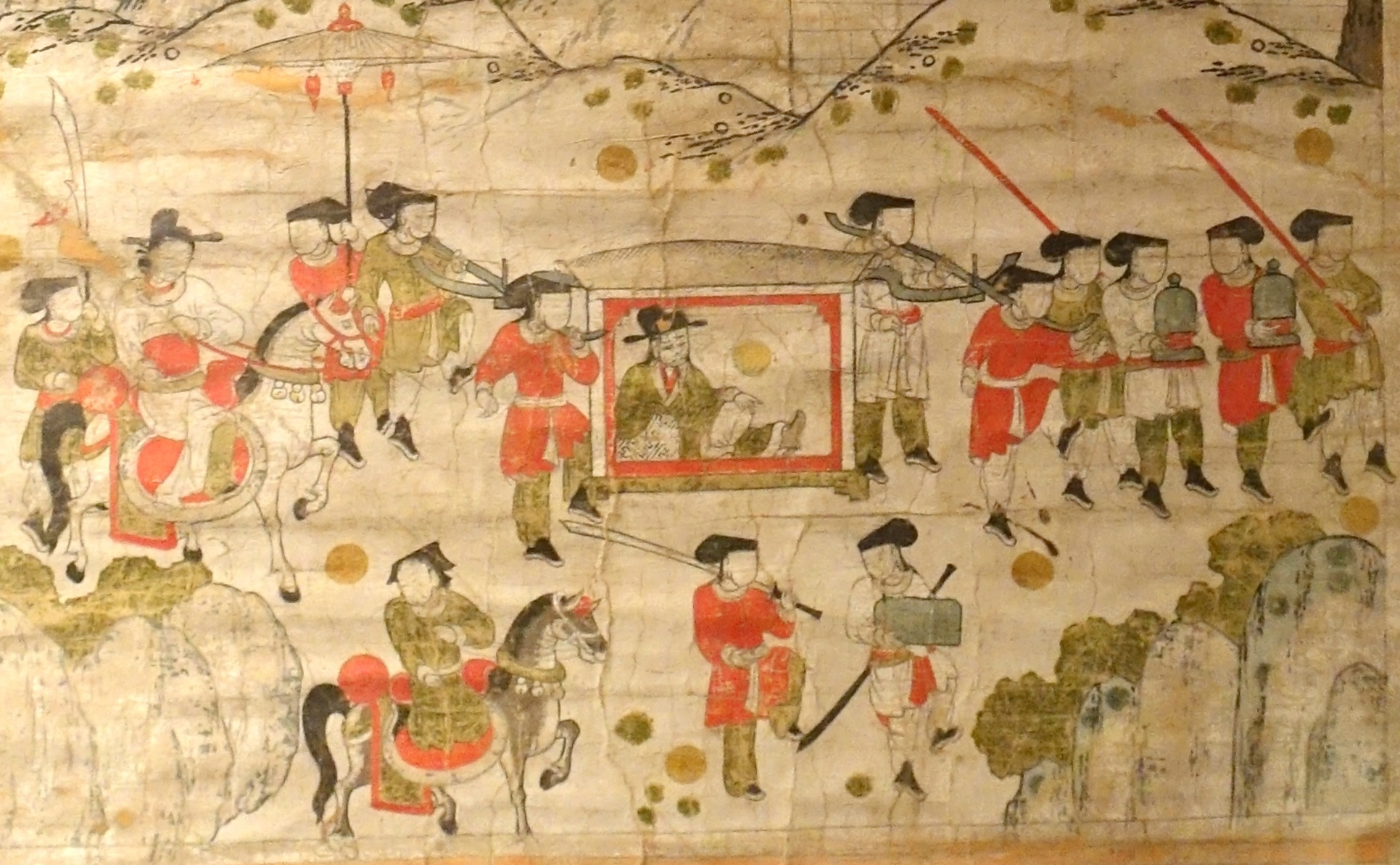
Áo viên lĩnh in the Lê dynasty

== See also ==
- Hanfu
- List of Hanfu
- Panling Lanshan
- Fanlingpao
