= Li Dashi =

Chinese historian (570–628)

Li Dashi (simplified Chinese: 李大师; traditional Chinese: 李大師; Wade–Giles: Li Tashih) (570 –c.June 628), born in Anyang, was a Chinese historian, and an officer during the Sui and Tang dynasties. He began the History of the Northern Dynasties and History of the Southern Dynasties, which were completed by his son, Li Yanshou (李延寿).
