= Li Yanshou =

Li Yanshou (simplified Chinese: 李延寿; traditional Chinese: 李延壽) (fl.early 7th century), born in Anyang, was a Chinese historian, and an official during the Tang dynasty. He finished the History of the Northern Dynasties and History of the Southern Dynasties, which were started by his father, Li Dashi (李大师).
