= History of the Northern Dynasties =

7th-century Chinese historical text

- Chinese: 北史
- Literal meaning: North History
Transcriptions
Standard Mandarin
- Hanyu Pinyin: Běishǐ
Southern Min
- Hokkien POJ: Pak-sú (col.); Pok-sú (lit.)

The History of the Northern Dynasties (Chinese: 《北史》; pinyin: Běishǐ; lit. ''North History'') is one of the official Chinese historical works in the Twenty-Four Histories canon. The text contains 100 volumes and covers the period from 386 to 618 CE: the histories of Northern Wei, Western Wei, Eastern Wei, Northern Zhou, Northern Qi, and Sui dynasty. Like the History of the Southern Dynasties, the book was started by Li Dashi and compiled from texts of the Book of Wei and Book of Zhou. Following his death, Li Yanshou (李延寿), son of Li Dashi, completed work on the book between 643 and 659 CE. Unlike most of the rest of the Twenty-Four Histories, this work was not commissioned by the state.

== Content ==
Volumes 1–5 contain the Wei annals including the Eastern Wei and Western Wei emperors. Volumes 6–8 contain the annals of the Northern Qi emperors, volumes 9–10 contain the annals of the Northern Zhou emperors, and volumes 11–12 contain the annals of the Sui emperors. Volumes 13–14 contain the biographies of empresses and consorts. Volumes 15–19 contain biographies of the imperial families of the Wei dynasties and volumes 20–50 contain the other Wei biographies. Volumes 51-79 contain biographies of figures from the Northern Qi (51–56), Northern Zhou (59–70), and Sui (71–79) dynasties. Volumes 80 through 100 contain other biographical content, including families of imperial consorts (80), Confucian scholars (81-82), literature (83), filial acts (84), recluses (75–76), exemplars of the loyal and righteous (85), virtuous officials (86), cruel officials (87), recluses (88), divination (89–90), exemplary women (91), favorites of nobles (92), foreign states and peoples (93–99), and a preface to the biographies (100).

== See also ==
- Twenty-Four Histories
  - History of the Southern Dynasties
