= History of the Southern Dynasties =

Chinese historical text

- Chinese: 南史
- Literal meaning: Southern History
Transcriptions
Standard Mandarin
- Hanyu Pinyin: Nánshǐ
Southern Min
- Hokkien POJ: Lâm-sú

The History of the Southern Dynasties is one of the official Chinese historical works in the Twenty-Four Histories canon. It contain 80 volumes and covers the period from 420 to 589, the histories of the Liu Song, Southern Qi, Liang, and Chen dynasties in southern China during the Northern and Southern dynasties period. Like the History of the Northern Dynasties, the book was started by Li Dashi. Following his death, Li Yanshou (李延壽), his son, completed the work on the book between 643 and 659. As a historian, Li Yanshou also took part of some of the compilation during the early Tang dynasty. Unlike the many other contemporary historical texts, the book was not commissioned by the state.

== Content ==
Volumes 1–3 contain the annals of the Liu Song emperors beginning with Emperor Wu. Volumes 4–5 contain the annals of the Southern Qi emperors, volumes 6–8 contain the annals of the Liang emperors, and volumes 9–10 contain the annals of the Chen emperors. Volumes 11–12 contain the biographies of empresses and consorts. Volumes 13-69 contain biographies of figures from the Liu Song (13–40), Southern Qi (41–50), Liang (51–64), and Chen (65–69) dynasties. Volumes 70 through 80 contain other biographical content, including virtuous officials (70), Confucian scholars (71), literature (72), filial acts (73–74), recluses (75–76), favorites of nobles (77), foreign peoples (78–79), and treacherous officials (70).

== Sources ==
Li Yanshou worked as a historical records assistant (直國史) and also as a compiler of historical records (修國史) in the Tang court. During that time, he reorganized and supplemented his father's writings. He drew from other standard histories of the individual dynasties and from miscellaneous histories (雜史). With review by Linghu Defen, Li Yanshou presented his work to the emperor in 659.

== See also ==
- Twenty-Four Histories
  - History of the Northern Dynasties
