= Also =

Also or ALSO may refer to:

- Advanced Life Support in Obstetrics, a program developed by the American Academy of Family Physicians
- Alsó-Fehér County, a historic administrative county (comitatus) of the Kingdom of Hungary
- ALSO Holding, a Swiss distribution and logistics company

== See also ==
- See also (disambiguation)
- Alsos (disambiguation)
