= Dopo (clothing) =

Korean traditional overcoat

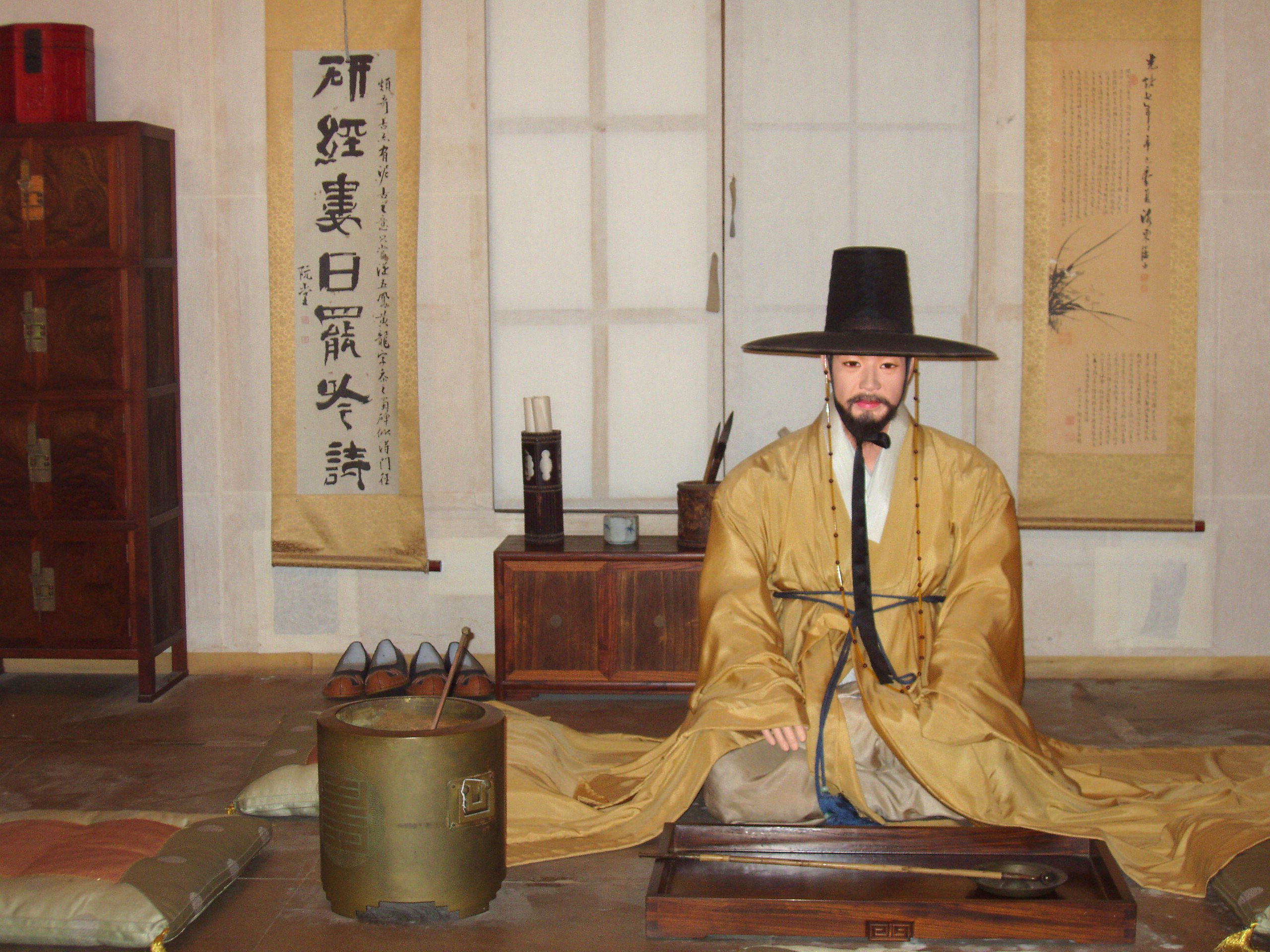
- A mustard-colored dopo

Korean name
- Hangul: 도포
- Hanja: 道袍
- RR: dopo
- MR: top'o

Dopo (Korean: 도포; lit. Taoist robe) is a variety of po, or overcoat in hanbok, which was first worn in the middle of the Joseon since the 16th century. The dopo was mostly worn by male Confucian scholars called seonbi during the Joseon period. It was also worn by Kings and princes and government officers. The dopo held a strong Confucianism value. It was worn as an everyday outer garment by Neo-Confucian scholars, who wore it as an official form of clothing or as a ritual clothing. It was also an ordinary robe worn by the court officials. Since the 1894 reform, all varieties of po with wide sleeves, including the dopo, were prohibited to be worn by King Gojong and instead people had to wear the durumagi.

== Construction and design ==
The dopo is a long over-coat (po) with V-neck and wide sleeves. It was long enough to reach the ankle of his wearer.

The white color dopo was typically worn for ordinary use while the light blue dopo was for festive occasions. Many other colors were also used. Dopo made of ramie was used in summer while those made out of silk and cotton were used in winter.

In terms of construction, the basic form dopo was similar to the jikryeong having a straight collar. It differed from the jikryeong in the shape of the mu (무, gusset). The mu of the dopo was found inside or on the back region of the garment; it was running along the front region of the garment and created two flaps on the back region of the garment.

Another characteristics of the dopo is its back region which is split into 2 on back center line and is fully covered by another piece of fabric called Jeonsam.

The dopo worn by the commoners were different in terms of styles from those worn by the members of the royal families; for example, the dopo worn by the commoners had a straight lapels while the dopo worn by King Yeongjo had a lapel which was made through a combination of square and pointy shape.

== Origins ==
It is recorded that the dopo was first worn in the middle period of the Joseon dynasty. The dopo started to appear in Joseon since the 16th century according to historical records and relics. According to Lee Eunjoo, the dopo was originally introduced from China but was localized in Korea through the integration of additional features.

According to historical documents such as Seongho saseol (성호사설/星湖僿說), Oju yeonmun jangjeon sango (오주연문장전산고/五洲衍文長箋散稿), the garment was influenced by Buddhism. The authors claimed that dopo was originally monk's robe called, gwontu (권투/圈套) which was identical to jangsam, another monk's garment. The Buddhist jangsam (장삼/長衫; lit. 'long gown') was a Buddhist robe, which was worn under the kasaya until the early Joseon, was in the form of the Chinese monastic robe called zhiduo. After the Imjin wars, the Joseon system of po (robes) was adopted which allowed the dopo and the durumagi (두루마기) (also known as juui) to be used as jangsam. According to Cho Geun-Hee, the name 'dopo' may have originated from China; however, the structure of the dopo was developed under the influences of other forms of traditional Korean overgarments. It is suggested by the author Myoung-Hee Lee that the dopo appears to have its origins from the robe worn in Goguryeo (고구려). Other authors such as Jungae Kim also suggest that it is the dopo could have originated from the jikryeong (직령/直領; coat with a straight collar) po and with which its bears similarities.

== Similar garments ==
- Paofu
- Daopao
- Zhiduo
- Jikryeong

== See also ==
- Hanbok
- Po
