= Jingnyeong =

Korean robe with straight collar closing to the right

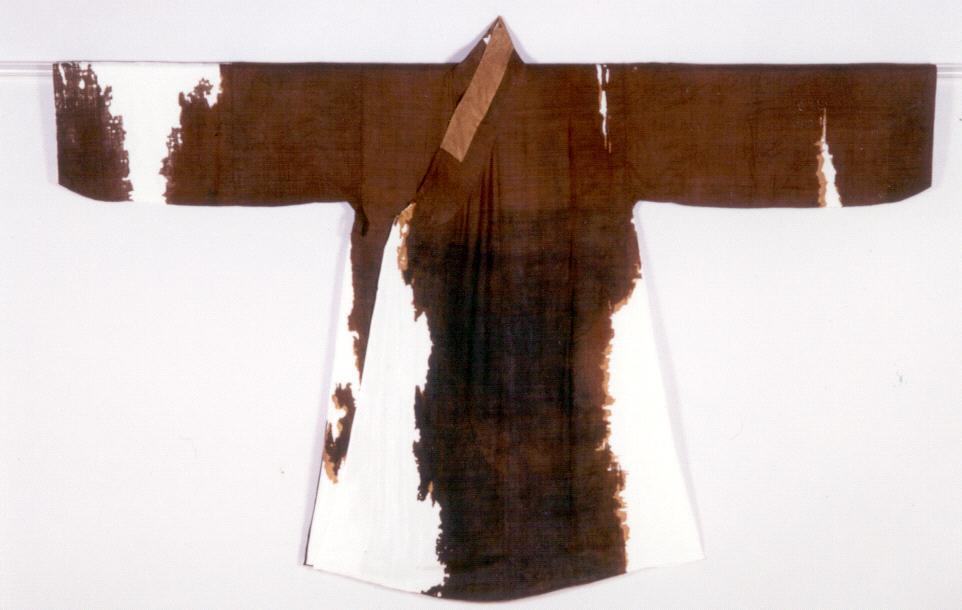

Korean name
- Hangul: 직령
- Hanja: 直領
- Lit.: Straight collar
- RR: jingnyeong
- MR: chingnyŏng

Jingnyeong (Korean: 직령; Hanja: 直領; lit. Straight collar), sometimes written as jikryung or jikryeong and also known as jingnyeongpo (직령포; 直領袍), is a type of po with a straight neckline. It could be worn as outwear by men and was sometimes worn under the dallyeong. The jingnyeong was worn in ordinary times and was worn all year round. It was also worn as a mourning attire during the Joseon period. Following the Japanese invasion (1592–1598), its usage as an outerwear decreased and was more often used as an undergarment. After the latter half of the 17th century, the jingnyeong was turned into an inner lining for the dallyeong, thus turning to a single lined garment.

== Design and construction ==
The collar of the jingnyeong as its name indicate is straight collar, closing to the right side. It may also come with rectangular side panels (무, mu) on each side of the robe.

=== Textile and colour ===
The jingnyeong could be unlined, lined, and padded. It was natural raw hemp white in colour when used as a mourning attire.

== Similar-looking garments ==
- Durumagi: the jingnyeong resembles this clothing.
- Zhishen (Korean: 직신; Hanja: 直身; RR: jiksin), jingnyeong is almost the same as the Chinese zhishen.
- Zhijupao (直裾袍)

== See also ==
- Hanbok
- Po
- Paofu
