= Zhishen =

Zhishen may refer to:

- Zhiduo (clothing), traditional Chinese attire (hanfu) for men
- Lu Zhishen, fictional character in Water Margin
