= See also =

See also may refer to:

- Citation signal, reference formats which often appear in technical, scientific, and legal documents
- cf., an abbreviation for confer, meaning "compare" or "consult"
- viz.
- q.v. quod vide (which see)
