= Zhiduo (clothing) =

Chinese robe for men and Buddhist monks

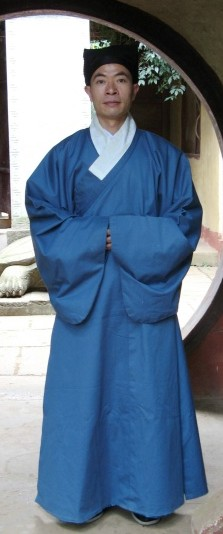
- Zhiduo, a man's casual robe, after medieval China

Chinese name
- Chinese: 直裰 or 直掇 or 直綴 or 直敠
- Literal meaning: Straight gathering
Transcriptions
Standard Mandarin
- Hanyu Pinyin: zhíduō

Zhishen
- Chinese: 直身
- Literal meaning: Straight body
Transcriptions
Standard Mandarin
- Hanyu Pinyin: Zhí shēn

Haiqing
- Chinese: 海青
- Literal meaning: Ocean blue
Transcriptions
Standard Mandarin
- Hanyu Pinyin: Hǎi qīng

Vietnamese name
- Vietnamese alphabet: áo tràng
- Chữ Hán: 襖長 or 袄𧛇

Korean name
- Hangul: 직철
- Hanja: 直裰
Transcriptions
- Revised Romanization: jikcheol

Japanese name
- Kanji: 直綴
- Hiragana: じきとつ
Transcriptions
- Romanization: jikitotsu

Zhiduo (viz. Chinese: 直掇; pinyin: zhíduō; lit. 'straight gathering': 直裰 and 直綴 and 直敠), also known as zhishen (Chinese: 直身; pinyin: zhíshēn; lit. 'straight body'; Korean: 직신; Hanja: 直身; RR: jiksin) when it is decorated with outside pendulums, and haiqing (Chinese: 海青; lit. 'ocean blue'), refers to two types of traditional changyi (simplified Chinese: 长衣; traditional Chinese: 長衣; lit. 'long clothing') or (shenyi-structured) paofu which were worn as outer robes by men in the broad sense; i.e. the casual zhiduo in Hanfu and the priests' zhiduo, in the broad sense. As a specific term, the zhiduo refers to the former. The zhiduo was also called daopao by Wang Zhishen in the Ming dynasty although the daopao refers to another kind of paofu. Nowadays, the haiqing is sometimes referred as daopao. In present days Taiwan, the haiqing is also worn by the Zhenyi Taoist priests. The term "haiqing" can also be a specific term which refers to the long black or yellow robe worn by Buddhist monks. The material can be silk or cotton.

The zhiduo was also introduced in both Japan and Korea where Chinese Buddhism had been spread. In Japan, the zhiduo was pronounced jikitotsu (Japanese: 直綴/じきとつ). In Korea, the zhiduo was pronounced as jikcheol (Korean: 직철; Hanja: 直裰), and was also referred as the jangsam (Korean: 장삼; Hanja: 長衫) of the Buddhist monks; the jikcheol was worn under the Kasaya until the early Joseon period.

== Origins and history ==
The Buddhist monk's zhiduo was worn as early as the Tang dynasty. After the middle Tang dynasty, the zhiduo was worn together with the right bare cassock, called jiasha (Chinese: 袈裟; pinyin: jiasha). The term jiasha was borrowed from the term Kasaya in China where it became a specific term to refer to a one-piece rectangular robe made out of patchwork. The jiasha was typically black in colour in the Han dynasty; purple in the Tang dynasty and turned yellow since the Five dynasties period until now as the colour yellow in Buddhism represents the highest set of values: desire-less-ness, humility, and renunciation. In certain geographical areas, the jiasha was also possible for the jiasha to be red or brown in colour. In China, there were also regulations established by the Imperial court which regulated the colour of the jiasha based on ranks but which could vary depending on the different dynastic period.

The wearing of the zhiduo together with the jiasha eventually became the standard dressing style for Buddhist monks and continued to prevail in the Song, Yuan, and Ming dynasties with little changes in styles. The custom and practice of wearing jiasha over the zhiduo then spread to Korea and Japan. In present-days, the Tang dynasty-style jiasha which is purple in colour still remains popular among the Japanese Buddhist monks.

During the early Qing dynasty, the Qing court issued the Tifayifu policies on the Han Chinese population, which led to the disappearance of most Hanfu. The zhiduo was, however, spared from this policy as it was part of the ten exceptions. In the Qing dynasty, the jiasha stopped being used and the Buddhist monk's zhiduo was used alone.

=== Buddhist robes ===
When Buddhism was introduced in China during the Han dynasty around 65 AD, the Indian Kasaya was also introduced. The Indian Kasaya was composed of the sanyi (Chinese: 三衣; pinyin: sānyī; lit. 'three robes'). However, the Indian Kasaya was not well received in China as the Chinese deeply believed in the Confucian concept of propriety; and as a result, any forms of body exposure was perceived as being improper and was associated with barbarians. Being fully clothed is an expression of Chinese clothing culture, and compared to their Indian counterparts, the Chinese did not perceive the exposure of shoulders as a sign of respect. The absence of right shoulder exposure started in northern China in order to shield the body from the cold and to fulfill the Chinese cultural requirements. This change occurred during the Chinese medieval era with the bareness completely disappearing in the Cao Wei period. It appears that shoulder exposure reappeared during the Northern Wei period before being criticized:

People from the West in general have their arms uncovered. [Monks] were afraid that criticism of this practice would arise, and so the arm needed to be covered.... In the Northern Wei period, people from the Palace saw the bared arm of the monks. They thought this was inappropriate. Then a right sleeve was added, both sides of which were sewn. It was called pianshan. It was open from the collar in the front, so the original appearance was maintained. Therefore, it is known that the left part of the pianshan was actually just the inner robe, while the right part is to cover the shoulder.

— Yi, Lidu, Yungang Art, History, Archaeology, Liturgy, Zengxiu jiaoyuan qinggui

The pianshan (Chinese: 偏衫; pinyin: piānshān; lit. 'side clothes'), also known as hensan (Japanese: 偏(褊)衫/へんさん) in Japan and pyeonsam (Korean: 편삼; Hanja: 褊衫) in Korea, was a short robe. To create the pianshan, the monks combined the Saṃkakṣikā, called sengzhizhi (Chinese: 僧祗支; pinyin: sēngzhīzhī), which is the inner inner garment worn by both the monks and nuns under sanyi, with the hujianyi (Chinese: 䕶肩衣; pinyin: hùjiānyī) of the Buddhist nuns. The hujianyi was a piece of fabric which covers the right shoulder of Buddhist nuns and was only used by the nuns; it started to be used after some Buddhist nuns suffered harassment by men for wearing right shoulder-exposing clothes.

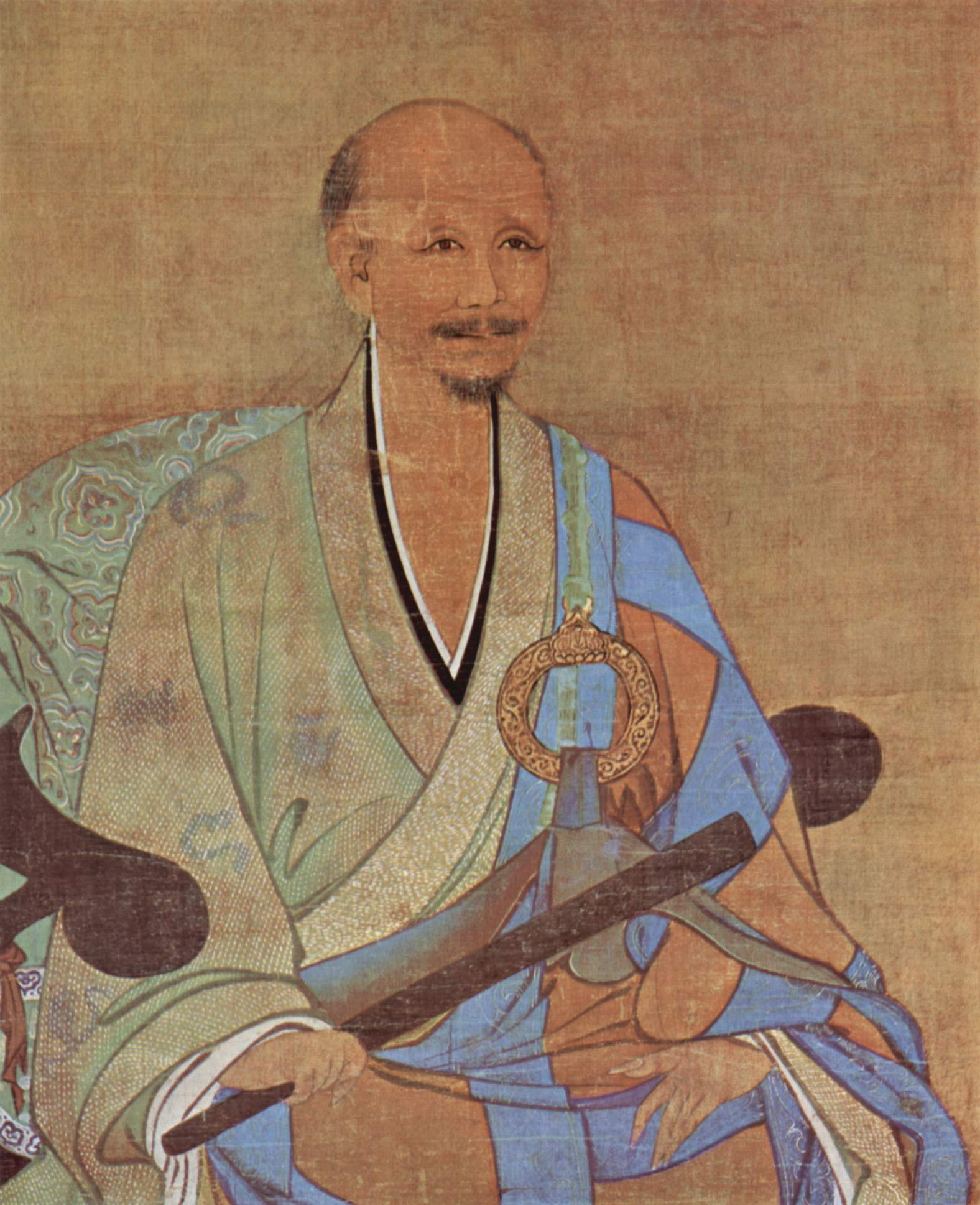
Portrait of Chan Buddhist master Wuzhun Shifan, painted in 1238, Song dynasty.

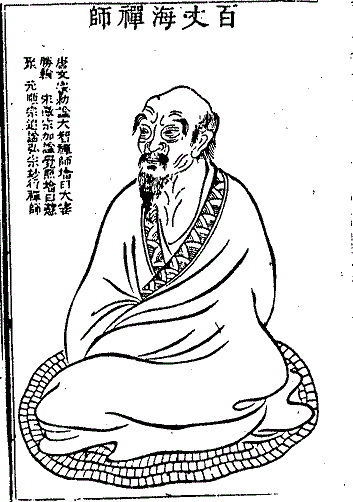
Illustration of Chan Buddhist master Baizhang Huaihai

Initially the Buddhist monks wore the pianshan as an upper garment along with a Chinese skirt called qun (Chinese: 裙; pinyin: qún; lit. 'skirt'), also called kun (Japanese: 裙/くん) in Japan and gunja (Korean: 군자; Hanja: 裙子) in Korea. In accordance to the philosophy of Confucianism and Taoism, the use of upper and lower garment, yichang, represented the Heaven and Earth which interacts in harmony; this concept appeared early on in ancient China and can be found in the Yi Jing《易經》. This style of dress was imitated until the Tang dynasty, when the pianshan and qun were sewn together to form a single long garment. Since the single long garment first appeared when the pianshan and qun were sewn together to form a long robe; this long robe follows the structure of the shenyi, and thus follows one of the traditional clothing system in Hanfu. By the time of the Yuan dynasty, this long robe was termed zhiduo. The term zhiduo can also be found in a 1336 monastic code called the Chixiu Baizhang qinggui《勅修百丈清規; 勅修百丈淸規; 'Imperial Edition of Baizhang's Rule of Purity'》, compiled by Dongyang Dehui in 1338 during the Yuan dynasty.

==== Haiqing ====
Modern-day Buddhist monks and laity refer to the long Buddhist robe as haiqing (Chinese: 海青). The wearing of these long robes by Buddhist monks is a legacy of the Tang and Song period. In ancient times, the haiqing was adopted by the Chan temples.

The haiqing originated from the hanfu-style worn in the Han and Tang dynasties. During the Tang and Song period, the Indian-style Kasaya went through major changes until they did not have the same style as the original Kasaya anymore. The haiqing however maintains some traces of traditional Chinese culture and shows some glimpse of the dress which had been worn by the elites in ancient China. For example, the closure of the haiqing which overlaps and closes to the right, a style referred as called jiaoling youren, was passed down from the Shang dynasty and at the same time coincides with the Buddhist custom of respecting the right side.

=== Casual zhiduo ===
According to Shen Congwen's Zhongguo gudai fushi yanjiu《中国古代服饰研究 – lit. 'Research on Ancient Chinese costumes'》, the zhiduo evolved from the zhongdan (Chinese: 中(单)襌; lit. 'inner garment') worn by the ancient monks.

Initially the zhiduo was mostly worn by monks, but in the Song dynasty and in the subsequent dynasties, it became a form of daily clothing for Han Chinese men. In the Song dynasty, the casual zhiduo was loose with a central seam at the back; it however lacked slits on its lower part.

== Types of zhiduo ==
=== Casual zhiduo / zhishen ===
The casual zhiduo was popular among men of the Song, Yuan and Ming dynasties, it could be worn by both scholar-official and the common people, and has several features:

- The bottom of robe reaches below the knee
- With overlapping jiaoling youren collar
- A centre back seam which runs down the robe
- With lateral slit on each lower side
- Without hem or lan (Chinese: 襴), which a decorative narrow panel encircling the robe, usually held in position below the knees
Casual zhiduo

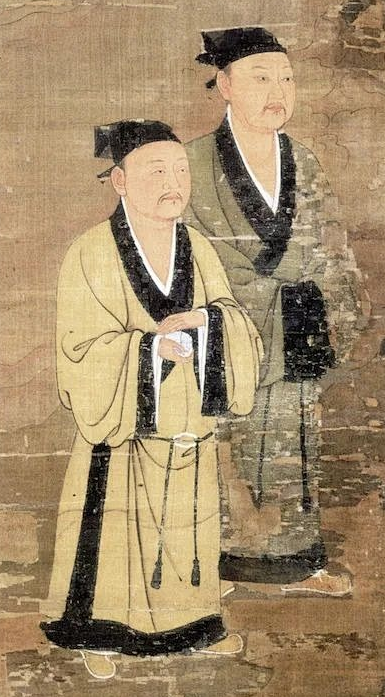
Song dynasty painting of scholars wearing zhiduo.

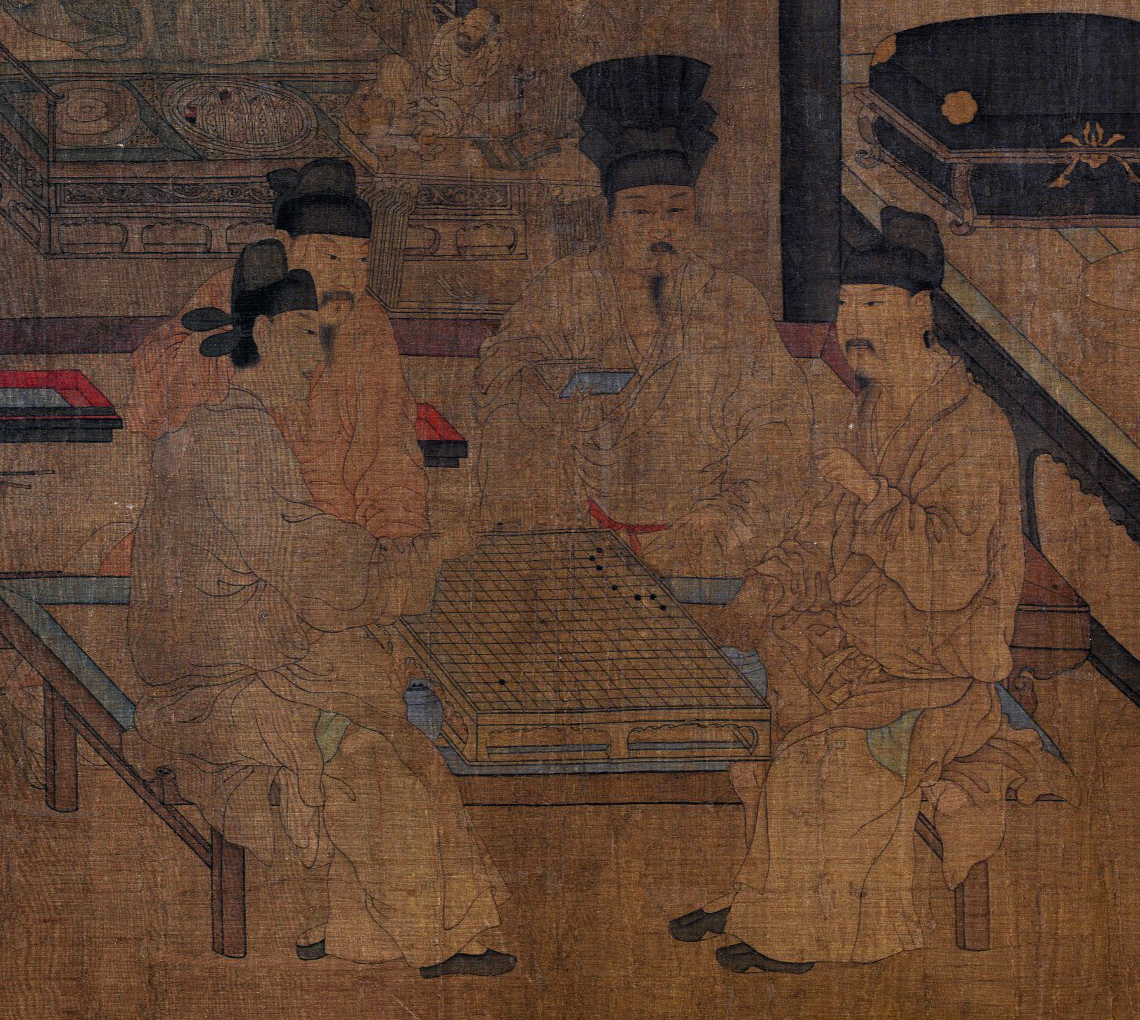
Song dynasty painting of men in zhiduo playing weiqi or go

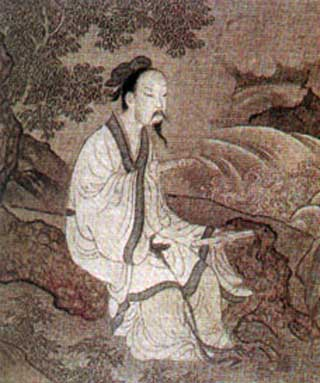
Song dynasty painting of a man wearing zhiduo.

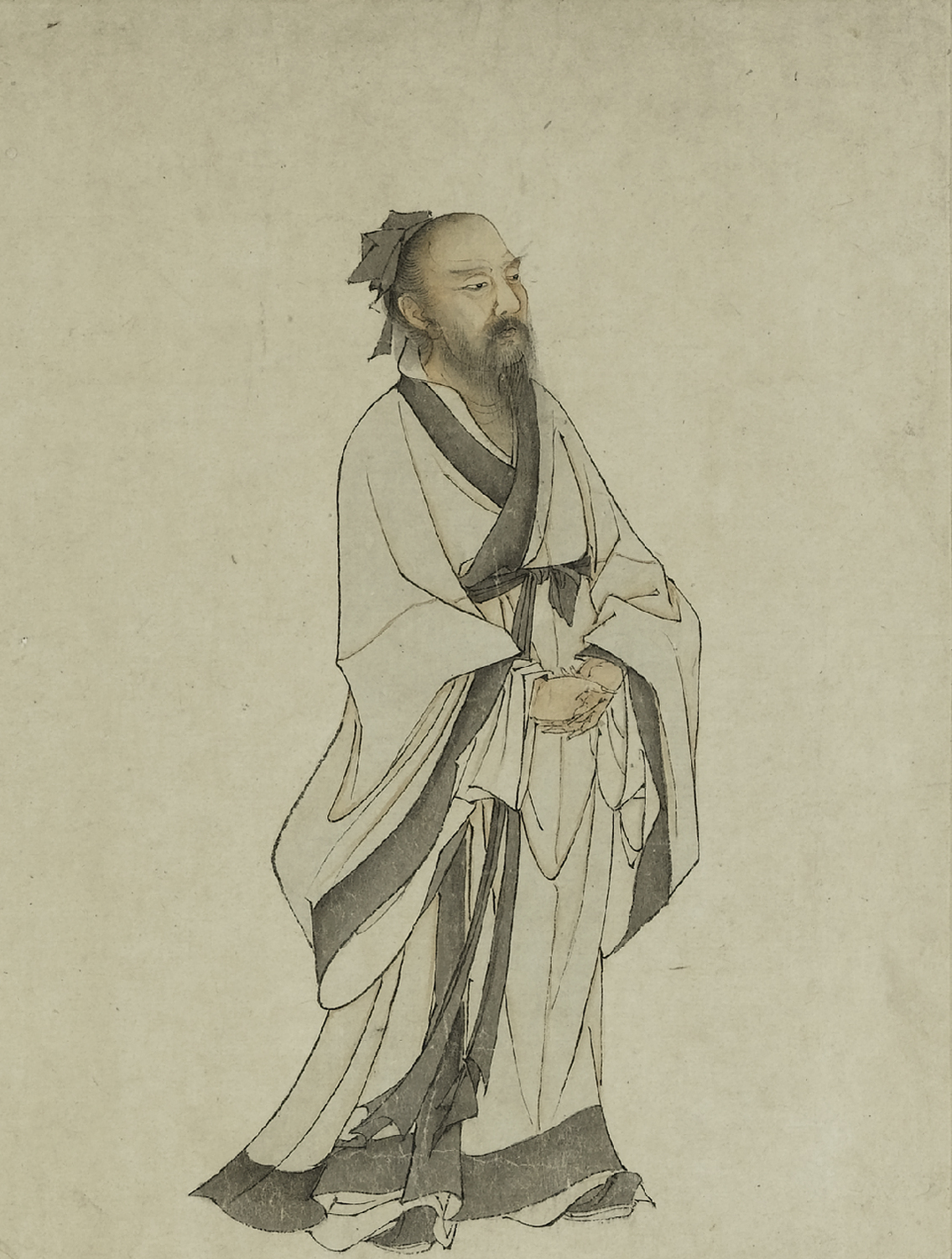
Yuan dynasty portrait of Geng Sangchu wearing zhiduo

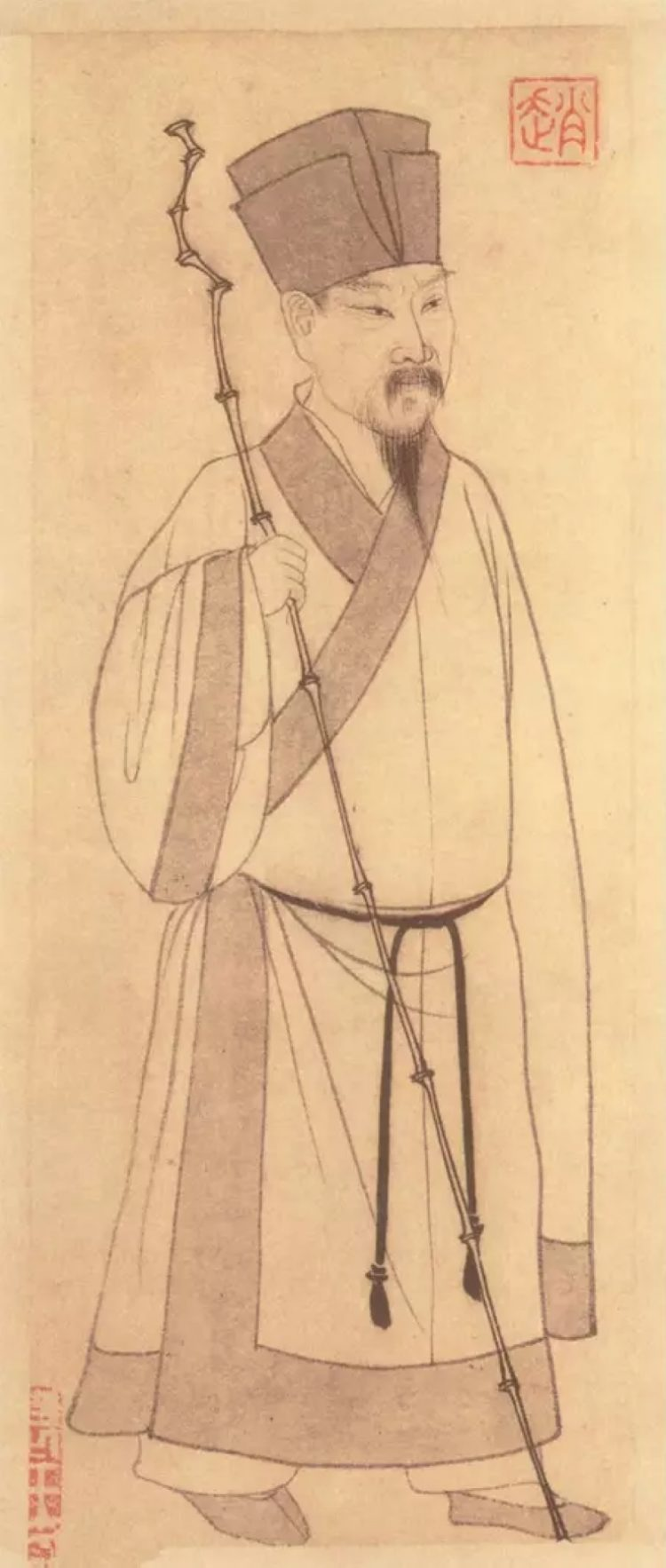
Yuan dynasty portrait of Su Shi wearing zhiduo

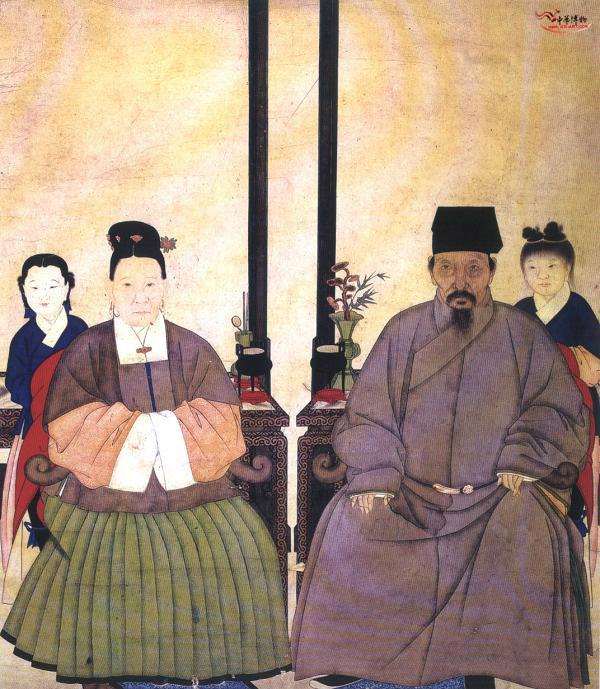
A Ming dynasty portrait illustrating a man wearing zhiduo, woman wearing banbi.

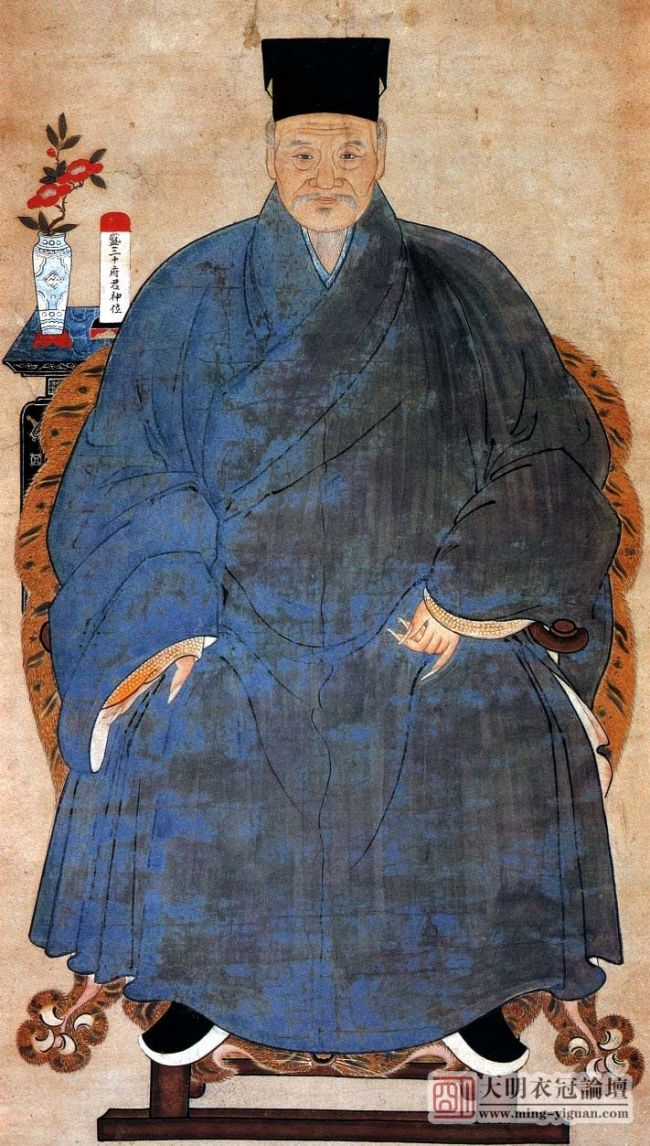
Ming dynasty portrait of men wearing zhiduo

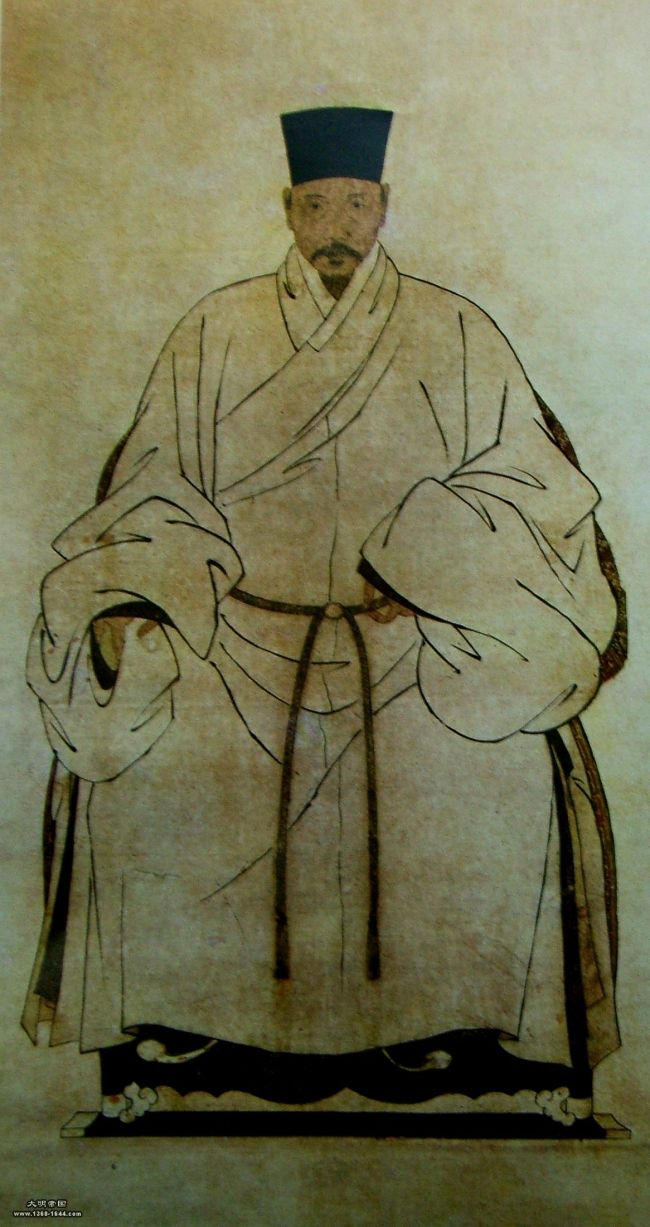
Ming dynasty portrait of men wearing zhiduo

=== Priests' zhiduo ===
The priests' zhiduo was generally worn by a Mahāyāna or Taoist priest, it had been popular since the Song dynasty, and has another several features:

- With loose cuffs
- With black borders around the edges of robe
- With a lan on the waistline of robe

==== Haiqing ====
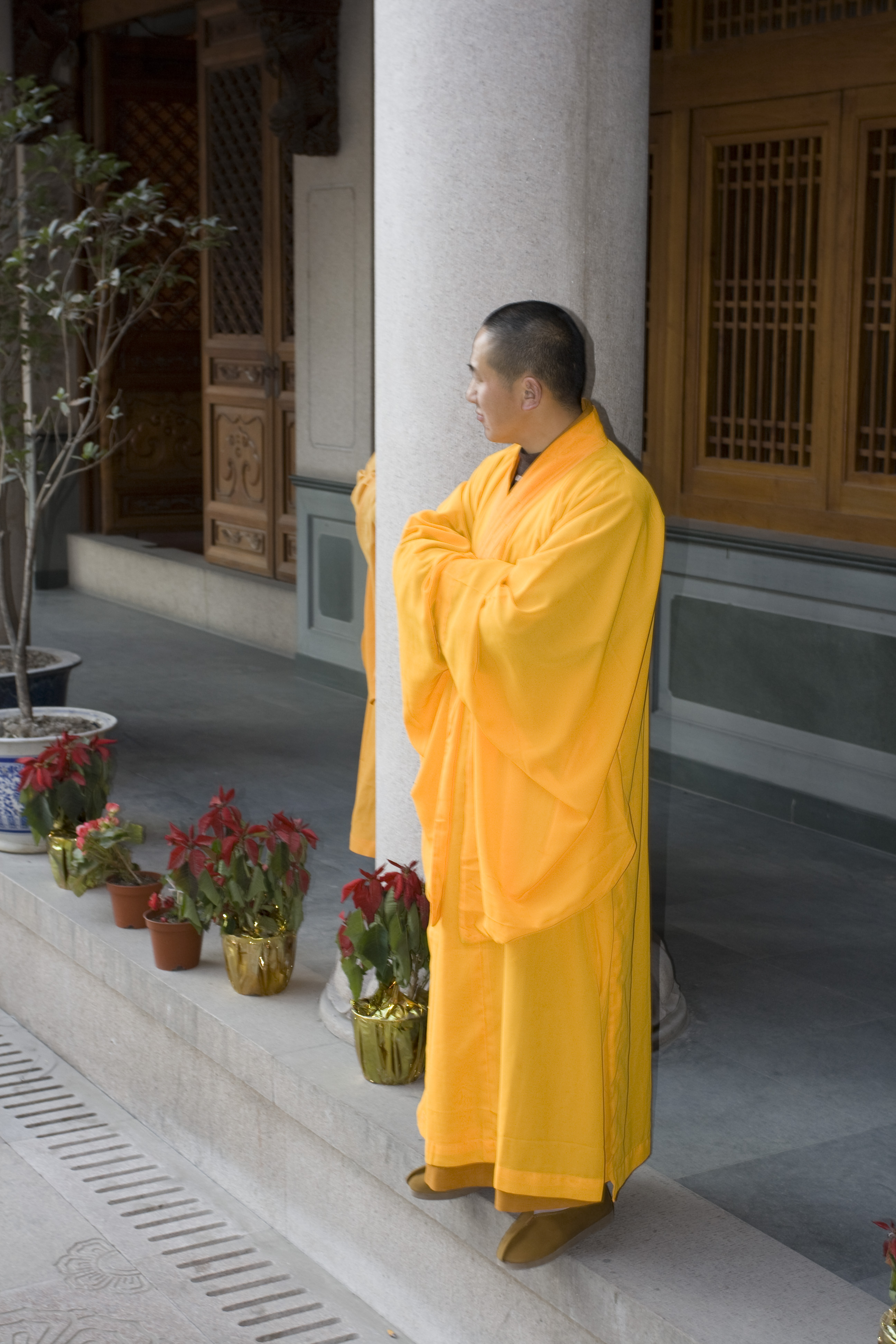
A Chinese Buddhist monk wearing a yellow haiqing.

The haiqing is a style worn by Buddhist monastic and laity who pay homage to the Buddha. It is characterized with wide and loose sleeves, along with wide loose waist and lower hem; these features made them comfortable to wear.

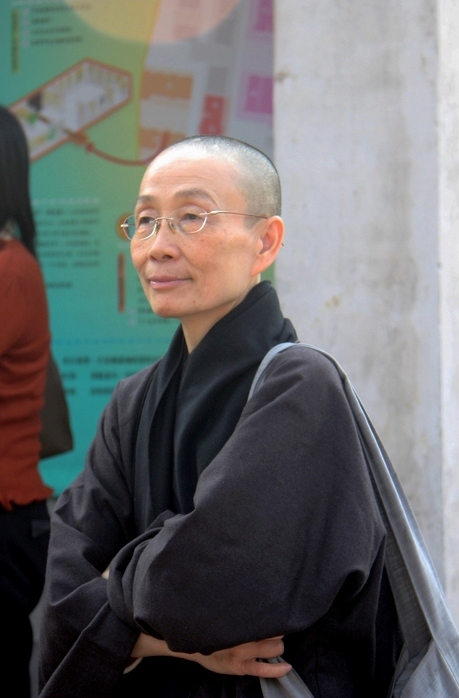
A Taiwanese Buddhist nun wearing a black haiqing.

Nowadays, the haiqing is typically found into the following colours: black which is the colour worn by most followers of Buddhism when they homage to the Buddha, and yellow which is the colour worn by abbot of a temple or by a monastic who is officiating during a Dharma service. It can also be found in dark blue.

== Derivatives and influences ==
=== Japan ===
In Japan, the zhiduo is known as jikitotsu (Japanese: 直綴/じきとつ). It is also known as koromo. The koromo is worn by Japanese Buddhist monks or priests; the robe is typically black or blue. A kesa is worn on top of the koromo.

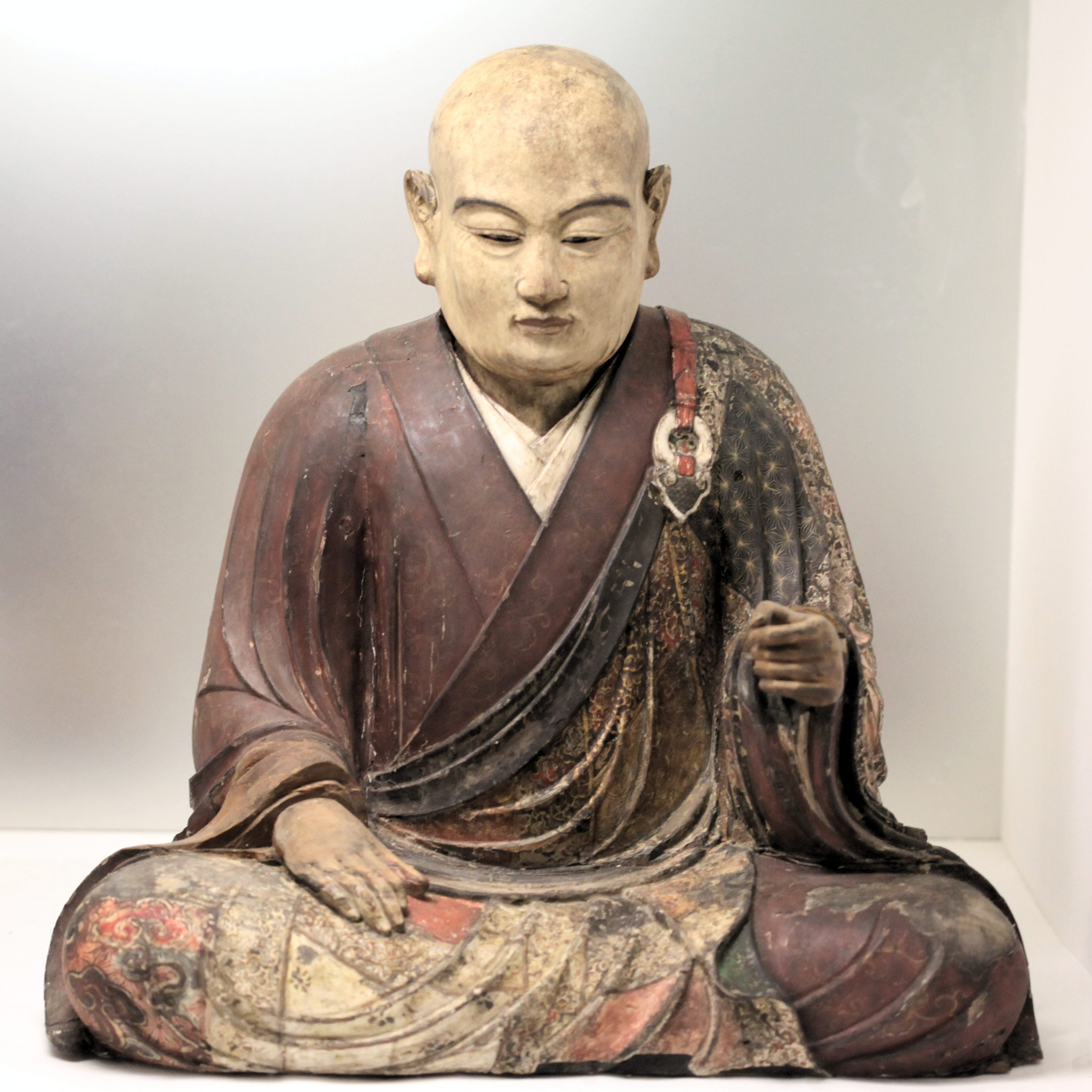
Portrait of a monk, Japan, 16th century.

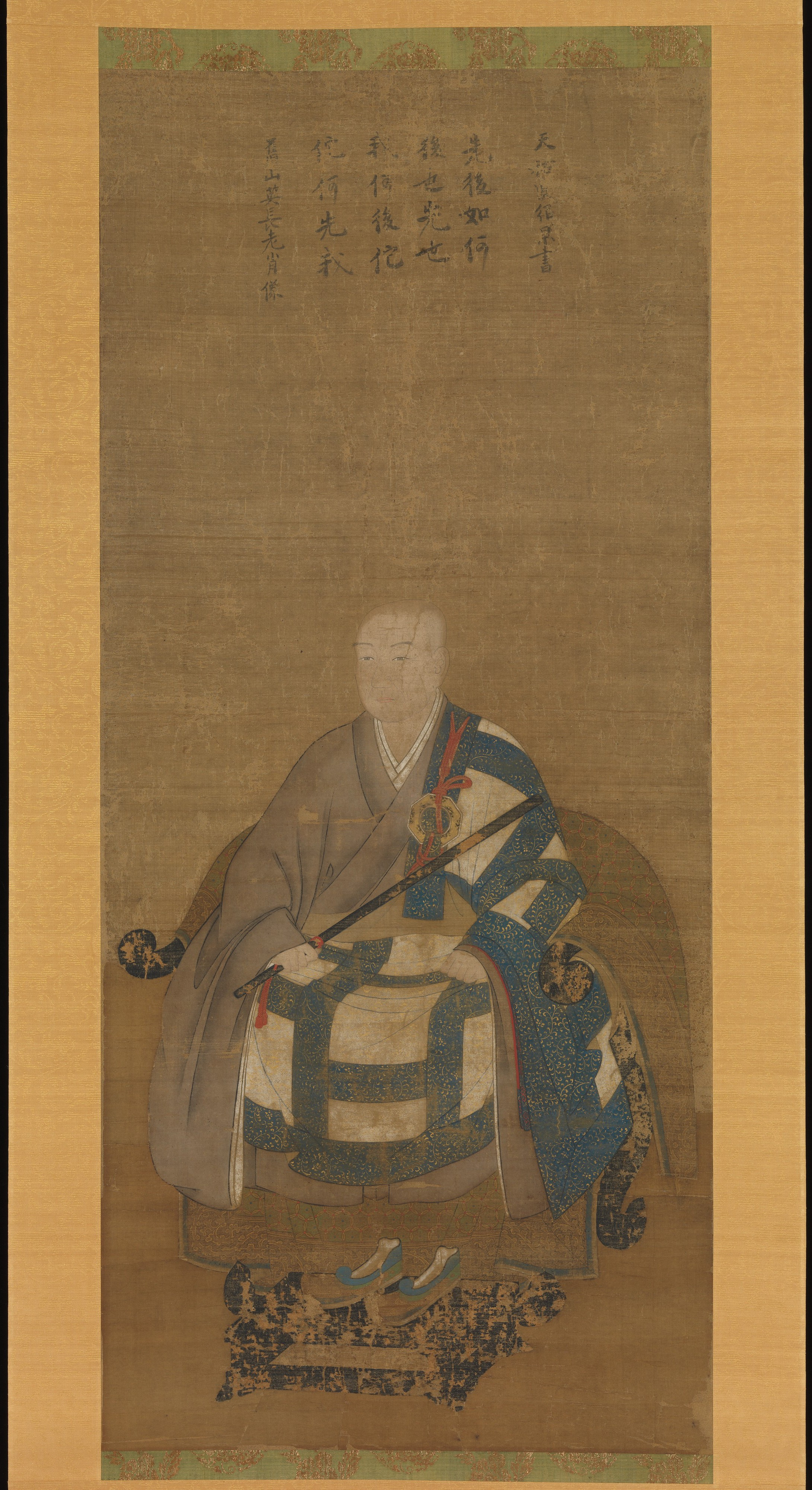
Portrait of Zen master Kyūzan Sōei (1605–1656).

=== Korea ===
In Korea, the zhiduo was known as jikcheol (Korean: 직철; Hanja: 直裰), and was also referred as the jangsam (Korean: 장삼; Hanja: 長衫) of the Buddhist monks. During the Three Kingdoms period, Buddhism was introduced to Korea through China, and the Korean Buddhist monks wore Chinese style Buddhist robes, which is the Chinese-style zhiduo. The jangsam worn by the Korean Buddhist monks was worn as early as the Goryeo period. Up until the early period of Joseon, the jangsam which was worn under the kasaya was in the form of the jikcheol.

There are two types of Buddhist jangsam which is worn as monastic robe in present days, the jangsam of the Jogye Order and the Taego Order of Buddhism. The jangsam of the Jogye Order has structural similarities with the jikcheol from China whereas the one from the Taego Order is more structurally similar to the traditional durumagi, which was a coat without vents, also known as Juui (Korean: 주의; Hanja: 周衣). The jikcheol developed in one of the current Korean, long-sleeved Buddhist jangsam. A form of present days Buddhist jangsam was developed through the combination of the wide sleeves of the dopo with the form of the durumagi.

The Buddhist jangsam was also adopted as the shaman robe in jeseokgori.

== Similar items ==
- Daopao
- Paofu
- Shenyi

== See also ==
- Han Chinese clothing
- List of Han Chinese clothing
