= ALSO Holding =

Swiss technology provider

ALSO Holding AG
- Type: Public company
- ISIN: CH0024590272
- Industry: IT Distribution, Information and communications technology
- Founded: 1984
- Headquarters: Emmen, Lucerne, Switzerland
- Key people: Gustavo Möller-Hergt (President of the Board of Directors), Wolfgang Krainz (Chief Executive Officer)
- Products: Hardware, Software, IT services, Cloud platforms
- Revenue: €15.24 billion (2025).
- Net income: €109.6 million (2025).
- Number of employees: 5,156 (2025).
- Parent: Droege Group AG
- Website: www.also.com

ALSO Holding AG or ALSO Group is a technology provider based in Emmen, Switzerland (canton of Lucerne). ALSO is listed on the SIX Swiss Exchange under ticker ALSN.SW. The majority shareholder is the Droege Group.

ALSO is one of the leading technology providers for the ICT industry, currently active in 31 countries in Europe, with additional global reach through PaaS partners. In 2025, ALSO reported net sales before PvA (principal-versus-agent adjustments) of € 15.24 billion, EBITDA of € 286.1 million and Group net profit of € 109.6 million.

== Business and operations ==
The ALSO ecosystem offers around 140,000 resellers with over 800 vendors across approximately 1,680 products categories. Its activities include distribution of hardware, software and IT services, the provision of IT solutions and services, subscription based cloud solutions and digital platforms.

ALSO structures its activities around three business models: Supply, Solutions and Service.

- Supply comprises the transactional range of hardware and software
- Solutions supports customers in the development of customized IT solutions including Internet of Things (IoT)
- Service includes subscription-based cloud offerings as well as platforms for Cybersecurity, Virtualization and Artificial Intelligence (AI), provided via the ALSO Cloud Marketplace (ACMP).

Independent market research reported in 2025 placed ALSO among the largest ICT distributors in the EMEA region.

Omdia-based reporting published in 2026 included ALSO among the fifteen largest IT distributors worldwide and identified the company as having recorded the highest growth rate within that group for 2025.

== Digital Platforms ==
ALSO operates digital platforms covering ICT procurement, cloud-service distribution and other technology areas. These include the ALSO Webshop, the ALSO Cloud Marketplace (ACMP), as well as platforms for the Internet of Things, Artificial Intelligence (ALSO AI Hub), Cybersecurity, Virtualization, Gaming and Circular IT.

=== ALSO Cloud Marketplace ===
The ALSO Cloud Marketplace, or ACMP, is a cloud-commerce platform through which subscription-based cloud services can be ordered, provisioned, billed and managed. The platform is used by IT resellers, Managed Service Providers (MSP) and other channel partners. ISV and CSP can use it to market their own solutions and the ACMP is also available as white-label cloud marketplace and worldwide through platform-as-a-service partners.

=== IoT platform ===
ALSO expanded its Internet of Things activities throguh the acquisition of Belgian IoT platform provider AllThingsTalk in 20219. The acquired platform was designed to connect devices and to collect, aggregate, visualize and analyse machine and sensor data. By integrating the AllThingsTalk platform into the ACMP, ALSO introduced subscription and consumption-based billing models for IoT products and services. The platform supports rapid IoT project development, allows machine and sensor data to be collected, aggregated, visualized and evaluated and includes functions for device, application and service management.

=== Other platforms ===
ALSO's other digital platform activities cover areas including artificial intelligence, cybersecurity, visualisation and gaming. The company reports digital platforms as part of its Service business model.

== History ==
ALSO was founded in 1984 and has been listed on the Swiss stock exchange since 1986. In 1988, ALSO became majority-owned by Schindler Holding AG.

On February 9, 2011, Actebis of Germany and the ALSO Holding of Switzerland merged their activities, renaming the company ALSO-Actebis Holding with its headquarters in Switzerland. On March 14, 2013, the name was changed back to ALSO Holding AG.

From 2014 through 2024, a series of transactions were made to expand geographic coverage and services. For example, in October 2019, ALSO Holding completed the acquisition of IT Solutions distributor Solytron Bulgaria.

In October 2021, ALSO acquired Ireo Soluciones y Servicios, a Spanish value-added distributor with a small-to-medium business (SMB) focus, with the objective of integrating it into its Cloud Marketplace.

In August 2024, SWS and Entec acquisitions were completed in Czech Republic & Slovakia.

In 2024, ALSO Group announced the acquisition of Westcoast, one of the largest UK based IT distributors. This consolidation significantly expanded ALSO's presence in Western Europe and reinforced its position as Europe's largest technology provider.

In February 2025, ALSO Group entered the U.S. market through its cloud business.

2025 was also a year of record results.

== Acquisitions and mergers ==
- 2011 – Combined with Actebis, a German ICT distributor, forming ALSO-Actebis Holding AG. The company returned to the name ALSO Holding AG in 2013.
- 2019 – Acquired ABC Data, an ICT distributor operating across Eastern Europe.
- 2019 – Acquired Solytron, an ICT distributor in Bulgaria.
- 2019 – Acquired AllThingsTalk, a Belgian IoT platform provider.
- 2021 – Acquired Ireo Soluciones y Servicios, a Spanish value-added distributor specialising in software and cloud services.
- 2023 – Acquired Commaxx, a Nordic value-added distributor active in IT infrastructure, cloud services and cybersecurity.
- 2024 – Acquired SWS and Entec, ICT distributors operating in the Czech Republic and Slovakia.
- 2025 – Completed the acquisition of Westcoast's operations in the United Kingdom, Ireland and France.
- 2026 – Acquired Datamatic's IT distribution business in Italy through ALSO Technology Milano.

== Leadership ==
ALSO Group is led by a four-member Group Management Board. Wolfgang Krainz serves as the company's CEO, a position he assumed in May 2024, succeeding longtime CEO Gustavo Möller Hergt. Krainz has been with ALSO since 2016 and previously held senior commercial and regional leadership roles.

For broader governance oversight, the company is supervised by its Board of Directors, whose composition is published on the official corporate site.
