= Viz. =

Latin abbreviation meaning "namely"

The abbreviation viz. (or viz without a full stop) is short for the Latin videlicet, which itself is a contraction of the Latin phrase videre licet, meaning "it is permitted to see". It is used as a synonym for "namely", "that is to say", "to wit", "which is", or "as follows". It is typically used to introduce examples or further details to illustrate a point, for example:

We both shared the same ambition, viz., to make a lot of money and to retire at 40.

== Etymology ==
Viz. is shorthand for the Latin adverb videlicet using scribal abbreviation, a system of medieval Latin shorthand. It consists of the first two letters, vi, followed by the last two, et, using U+A76B ꝫ LATIN SMALL LETTER ET. With the adoption of movable type printing, the (then current) blackletter form of the letter ⟨z⟩, $\mathfrak{z}$, was substituted for this symbol since few typefaces included it.

== Usage ==
In contrast to i.e. and e.g., viz. is used to indicate a detailed description of something stated before, and when it precedes a list of group members, it implies (near) completeness.

- Viz. is usually read aloud as "that is", "namely", or "to wit", but is sometimes pronounced as it is spelled, viz.: /ˈvɪz/.
- Videlicet is pronounced /vɪˈdɛlɪsɛt/ or /wɪˈdeɪlɪkɛt/ in English-speaking countries.

=== Examples ===
- The intended meaning of his speech, viz. that our attitude was in fact harmful, was not understood.
- The later two problems, viz. his debt and his back pain, could not be so easily solved.
- "My grandfather had four sons who grew up, viz. Thomas, John, Benjamin and Josiah."
- The noble gases, viz. helium, neon, argon, krypton, xenon, and radon, show an unexpected behaviour when exposed to this new element.

== Compared with scilicet ==
A similar expression is scilicet, from earlier scire licet, abbreviated as sc., which is Latin for "it is permitted to know." Sc. provides a parenthetic clarification, removes an ambiguity, or supplies a word omitted in preceding text, while viz. is usually used to elaborate or detail text which precedes it.

In legal usage, scilicet appears abbreviated as ss. It can also appear as a section sign (§) in a caption, where it is used to provide a statement of venue, that is to say a location where an action is to take place.

Scilicet can be read as "namely," "to wit," or "that is to say," or pronounced /ˈskiːlɪkɛt/ in English-speaking countries, or also anglicized as /ˈsɪlɪsɛt/.

== See also ==
- See also
- Eo ipso
- Cf.
- I.e.
- Sic
- The dictionary definition of vis-à-vis at Wiktionary
