= Alsos =

Alsos may refer to:

== Places ==
- Alsos Forest, a natural park in Nicosia, Cyprus
- Alsos, Achaea, a village in the municipality of Sympoliteia in Achaea, Greece
- Alsos Nea Smyrni
- Alsos Veikou, a public park in Galatsi, in northern Athens, Greece
- Alsos or Alysos, a rock in Meteora, Greece

== People ==
- Christel Alsos (born 1984), Norwegian singer

== Other uses ==
- Alsos Digital Library for Nuclear Issues
- Alsos Mission, an effort by the British and United States during World War II
