= Paofu =

Long Chinese robes

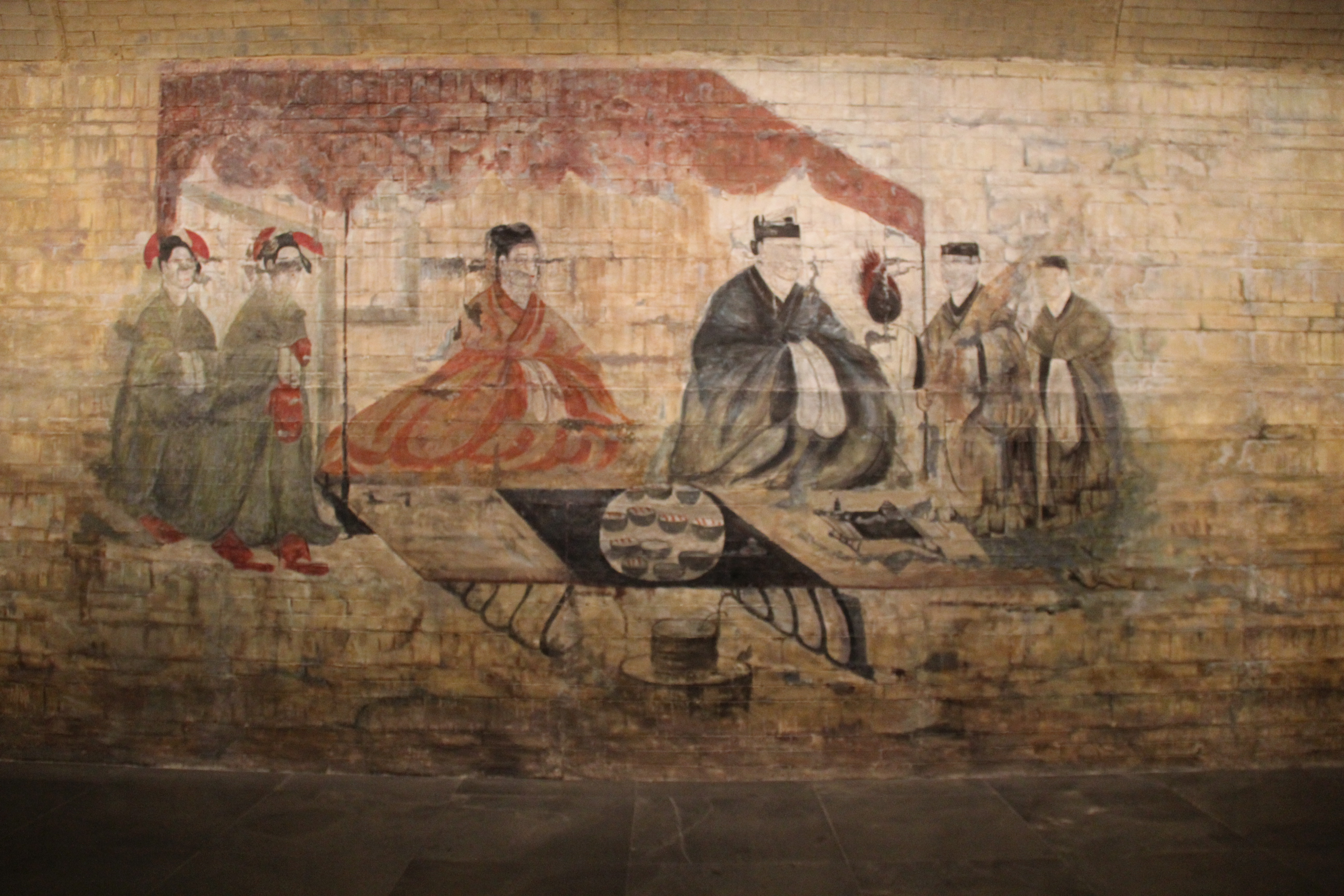
- Men and women dressed in jiaolingpao (cross-collar robe), Han Tomb Mural, Luoyang

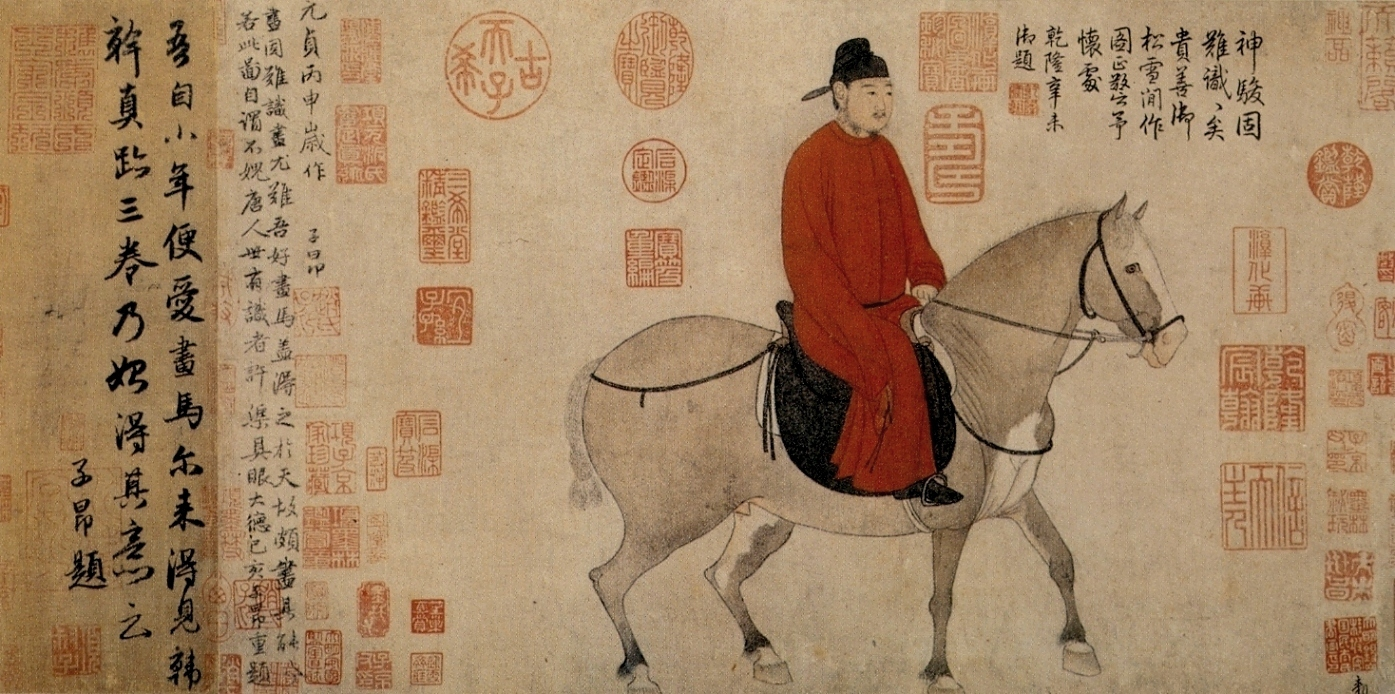
- Zhao Mengfu wearing a yuanlingpao (round collar robe), dated 1296.

Chinese name
- Chinese: 袍服
- Literal meaning: Gown or robe
Transcriptions
Standard Mandarin
- Hanyu Pinyin: Páofú

Pao
- Chinese: 袍
Transcriptions
Standard Mandarin
- Hanyu Pinyin: Páo
Yue: Cantonese
- Jyutping: pou4

Korean name
- Hangul: 포
- Hanja: 袍
Transcriptions
- Revised Romanization: Po

English name
- English: Robe/ Chinese robe

Paofu (Chinese: 袍服; pinyin: páofú; lit. 'robe'), also known as páo (袍; 'robe') for short, is a form of a long, one-piece robe in Hanfu, which is characterized by the natural integration of the upper and lower part of the robe which is cut from a single fabric. The term is often used to refer to the jiaolingpao and the yuanlingpao. The jiaolingpao was worn since the Zhou dynasty and became prominent in the Han dynasty. The jiaolingpao was a unisex, one-piece robe; while it was worn mainly by men, women could also wear it. It initially looked similar to the ancient shenyi; however, these two robes are structurally different from each other. With time, the ancient shenyi disappeared while the paofu evolved gaining different features in each succeeding dynasties; the paofu continues to be worn even in present day. The term paofu refers to the "long robe" worn by ancient Chinese, and can include several form of Chinese robes of various origins and cuts, including Changshan, Qipao, Shenyi, Tieli, Zhisun, Yesa.

== Terminology ==
The term paofu (袍服) is composed of the Chinese characters pao (袍), which literally means "robe", and fu (服) which literally means "clothing". The character pao (袍) is the same character which is used as an abbreviated synonym of paofu.

The Chinese character 袍 can be found in ancient texts dating prior to the Qin and Han dynasties, such as in the Lun Yu (論語). According to the Guangyun, the character 袍 can also refer to the chángrú (长襦; 長襦; 'long jacket'). The term changru which appear in the ancient texts has been described as the precursor of the chang ao by scholars.

=== Naming based on design ===
There are different types of paofu, which can be referred by different names and terms based on its style, cut, length, and specific features.

The term changpao is a generic term which refers to robes which are long in length and can include different forms of long robes, such as the ancient shenyi, the yuanlingpao.

There are also specific terms which is used to described pao with or without lining or padding: for example, jiapao and mianpao, yunpao (縕袍; 'hemp robe') which is robe quilted with hemp.

There are specific types of paofu, which can be named based on their specific cut, construction, accessories, and wearing styles, are the:

- Baoyi bodai – a simple, loose-fitting robes with long, open sleeves, a style worn by men which provided a carefree look to its wearer.
- Daopao
- Guipao
- Jiaolingpao – long robe with a cross-collar closing which closes to the right; worn since the Zhou dynasty.
- Panling lanshan vs Yuanlingpao vs Fanlingpao
- Longpao (龙袍) – dragon robe.
- Xi (襲) – an ancient term used to refer to the paofu which closed on the left side in a style called zuoren (左衽袍) as defined by the Shuowen jiezi. It was typically worn by a deceased person.
- Zhiduo vs Zhishen

== Construction and design ==
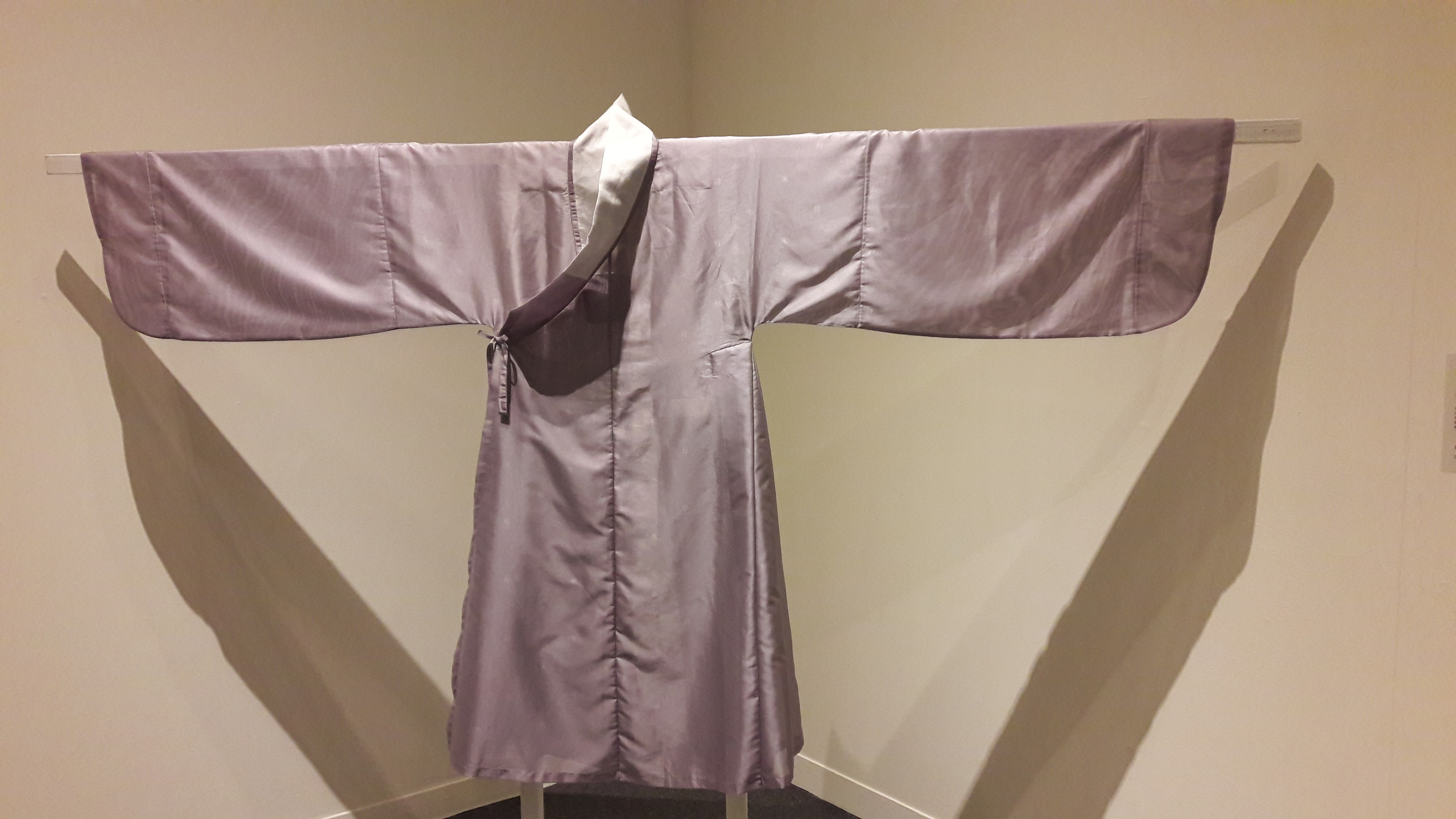
A daopao, a form of paofu with a youren closure, Ming dynasty

The paofu and the shenyi are both one-piece robes as an result. However, the difference between those two is the cut and construction of the garment.

The shenyi is composed of two parts: an upper garment called yi and a lower garment called chang, which are then sewn together into a one-piece robe; and therefore, there is the presence of a middle seam where the two parts were connected together. The paofu, on the other hand, has its upper and lower part made out of a single fabric leading to the absence of middle seam between the upper and lower part.

Typically the paofu closes on the right side in a style called youren and was a very important symbol of cultural identity for the Han Chinese. The paofu could also be found closing on the left style called zuoren. The paofu with a zuoren closure was generally associated with the dress of ethnic minorities and the Hufu; however, they could also be the funeral dress of the Han Chinese. It was also a possible for some living Han Chinese to adopt paofu with a zuoren closure in geographical areas which were ruled by foreign nationalities.

== History ==
=== Zhou dynasty ===
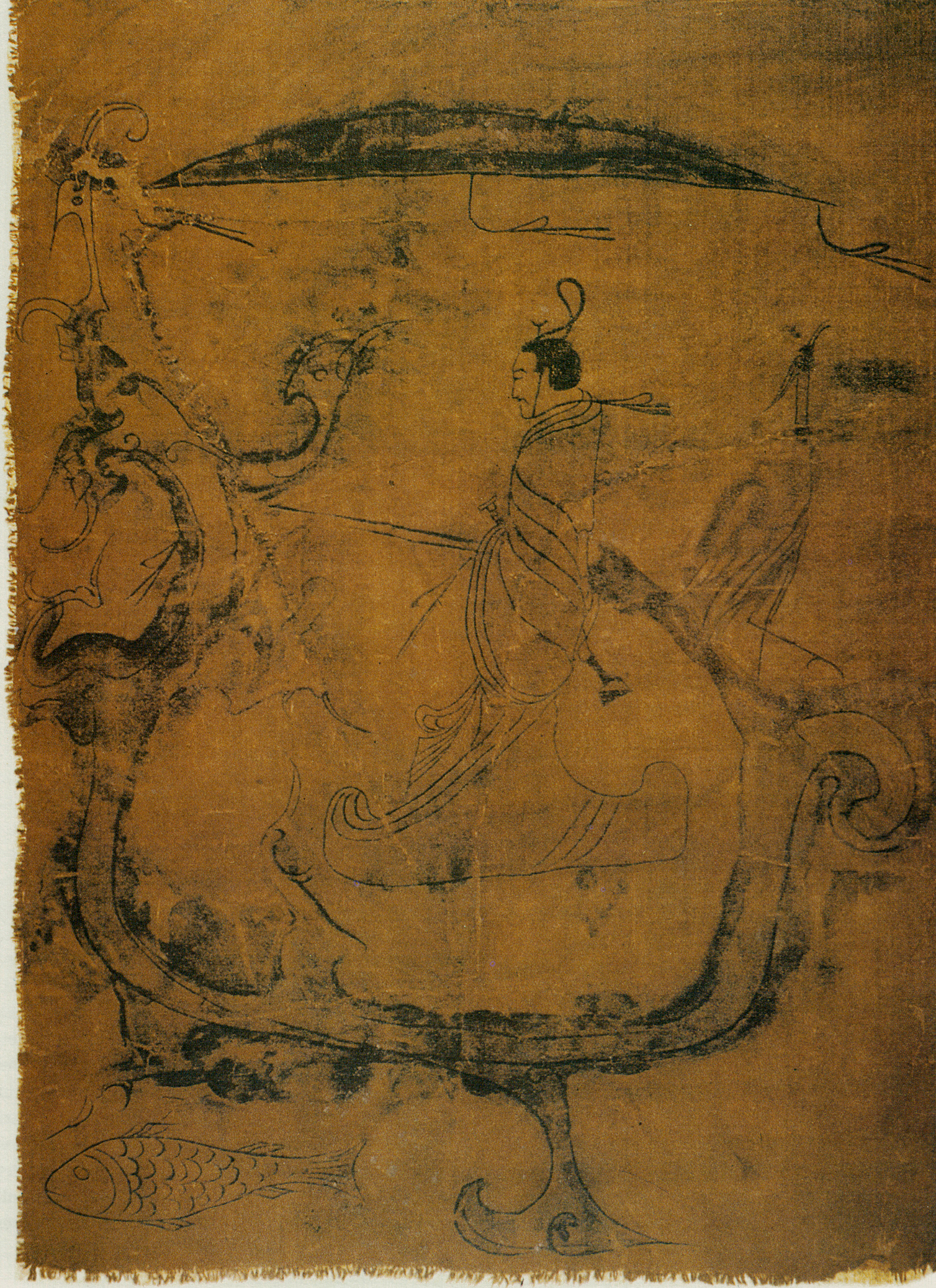
Eastern Zhou silk painting featuring a man wearing shenyi and a guan with a dragon.

In the Zhou dynasty, paofu was one of the basic clothing worn by the Han Chinese people, along with the Chinese trousers, called ku. The style of paofu which was widely worn in this period is the jiaolingpao, which was a long robe with an overlapping front closing on the right side, a style called jiaoling youren. The jiaolingpao was made with 2-length of fabric which started from the back hem and continued down to the front hem without discontinuity over the shoulders; they were then sewed at the central region of the back and under the arms which often allowed for side vents on the lower side seams to be formed. To form the sleeves, 2 additional pieces of fabrics were sewed together at the shoulder regions of the garment. It was left open in the front, and it could be closed at the waist with a tie or with a belt. Other pieces of fabric could be added to make the width at the sides bigger or to create the overlapping front of the robe.

=== Han dynasty ===
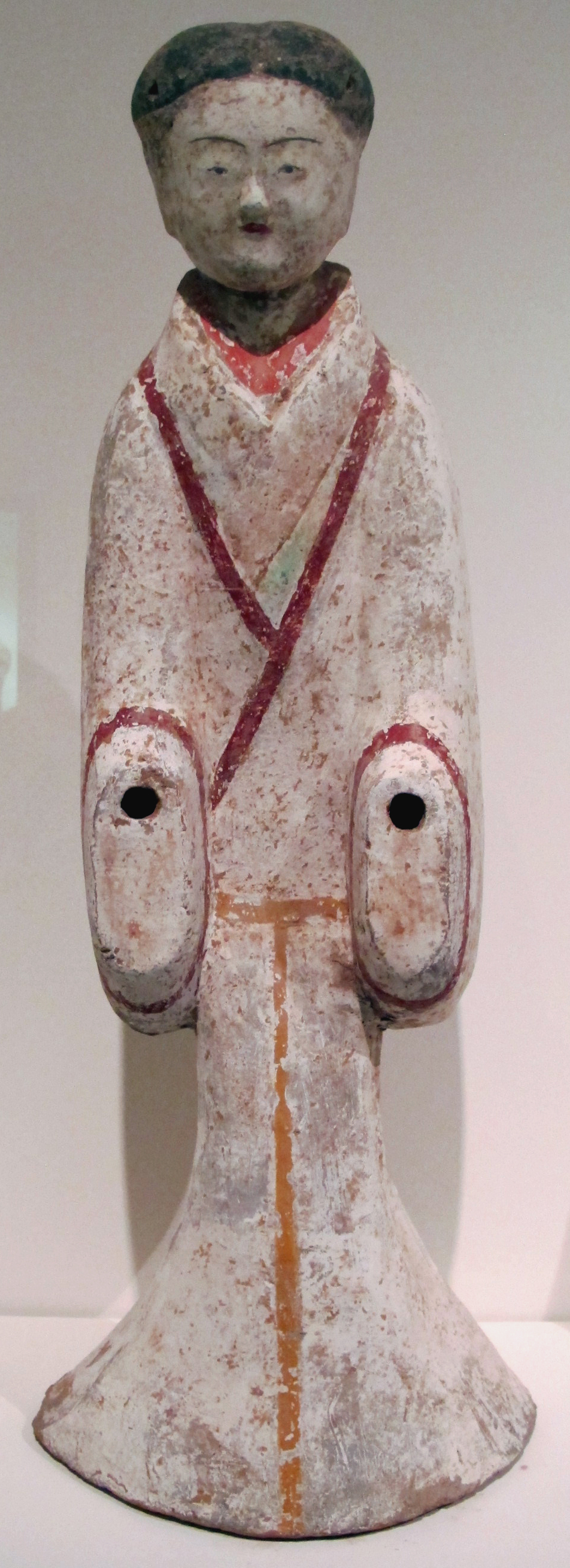
Woman wearing a floor-length jiaolingpao revealing her undergarments, Han dynasty.

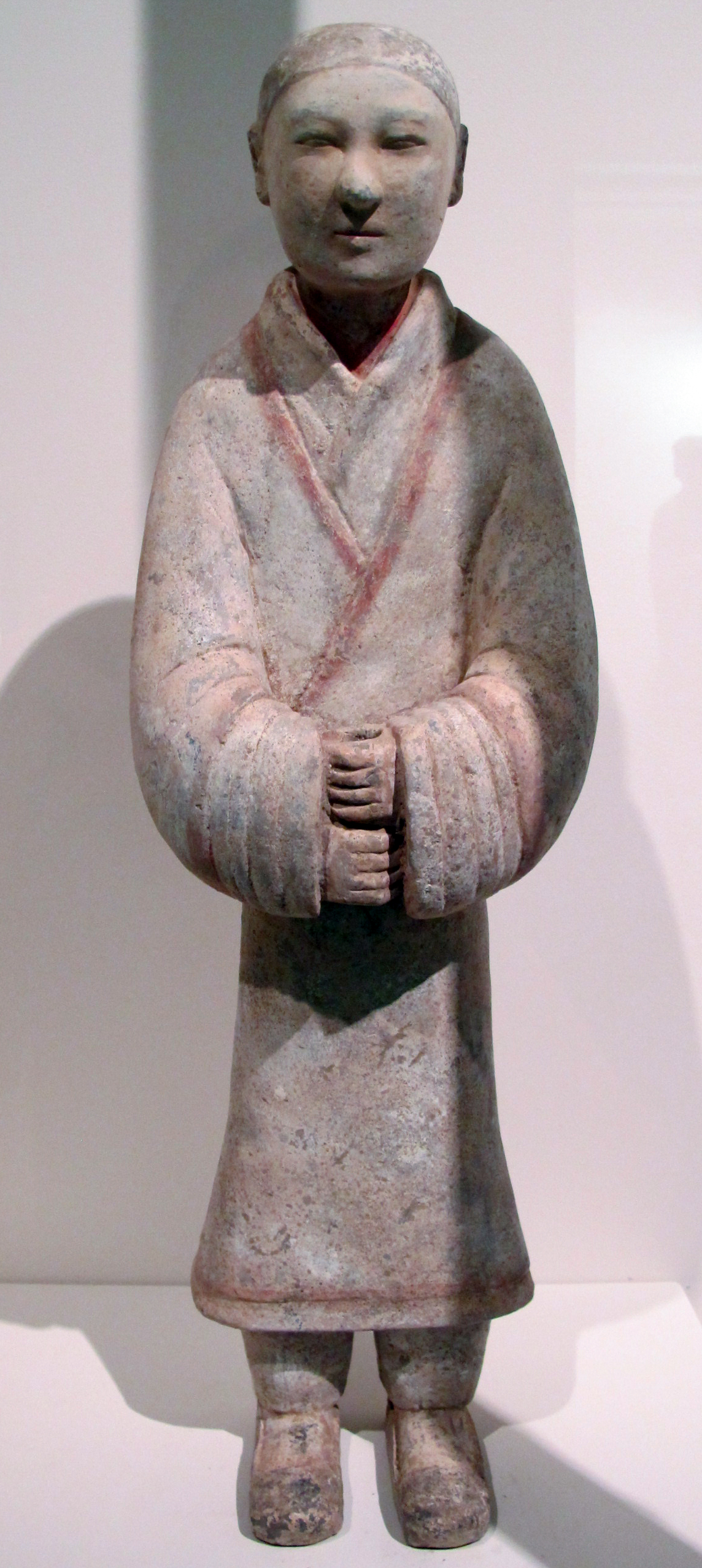
A male servant wearing a mid-calf length jiaolingpao, Han dynasty.

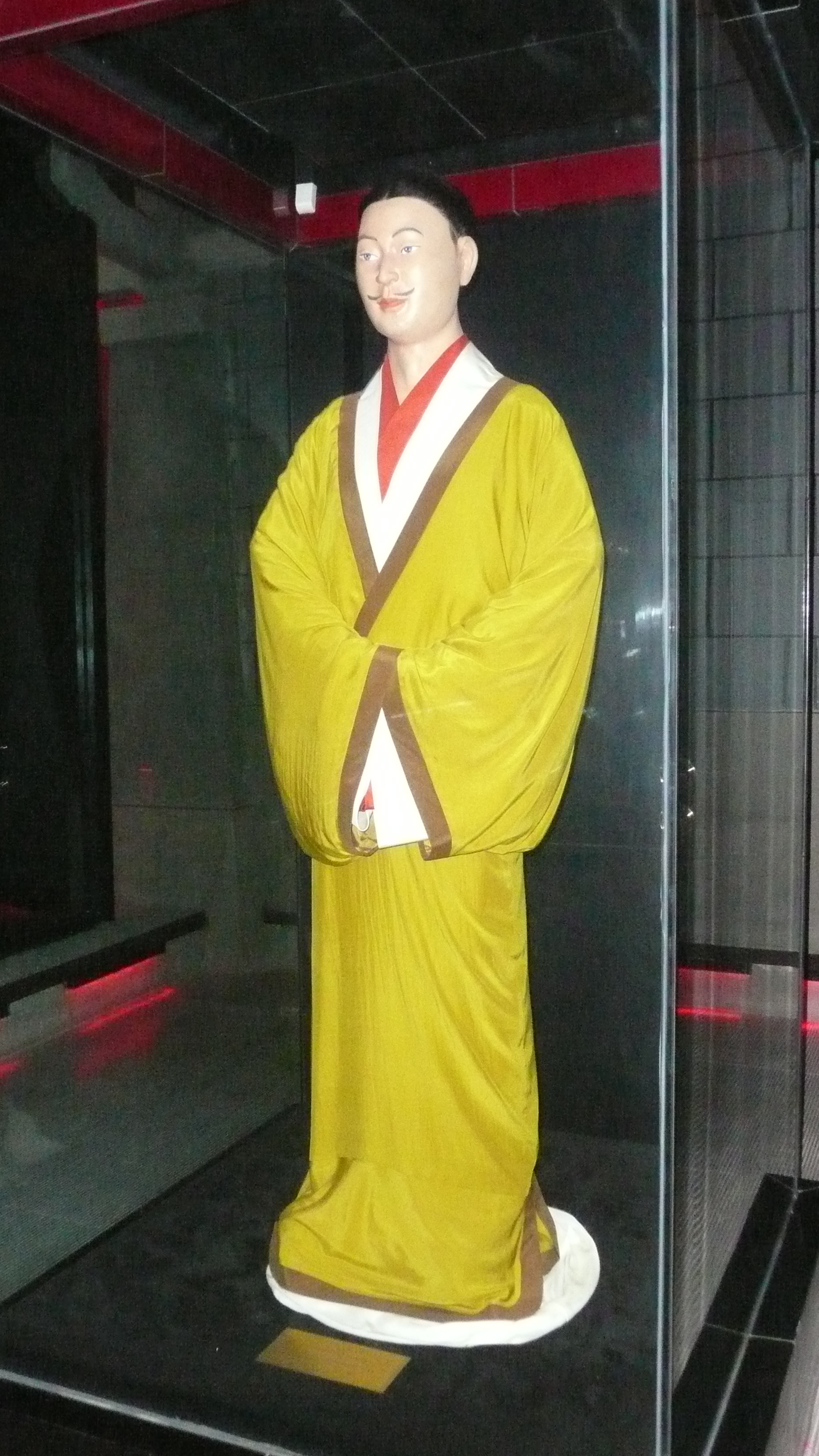
Reconstruction of Han dynasty shenyi.

The jiaolingpao became a prominent form of attire in the Han dynasty; it was mainly worn by men, although it was sometimes worn by women. Even with the rising popularity of jiaolingpao, women continued to wear shenyi. In the Han dynasty, jiaolingpao was typically worn by the members of royalty and by the aristocrats as an outerwear. It was also the uniform of government officials. Around the 206 BC, the jiaolingpao worn by elders had large sweeping sleeves which would be tied tightly to the wrist. The jiaolingpao could be found in different length; the jiaolingpao, which could reach down to the ankles, were usually worn by scholars or elderlies whereas knee-length jiaolingpao were worn by warriors and heavy labourers. Elderlies started to wear the ankle-length jiaolingpao after 206 BC.

The jiaolingpao in the Han dynasty had linings; and it could be called jiapao or mianpao based on whether it was padded. It was padded or quilted for warmth. The sleeves were typically very wide and would become cinched at the wrists. The collar was jiaoling youren, and it was cut lower than the shenyi, and it was also low enough to expose the undergarments of its wearer. It was also typically decorated with an embroidered dark-coloured band at the collar, front hem, and at the wrists.

=== Wei, Jin, Northern and Southern dynasties ===
By the Wei, Jin and Northern and Southern dynasties, the jiaolingpao of the Han dynasty evolved into the bāoyī bódài (褒衣博带; 褒衣博帶; 'loose clothing long belt') and into the more complex and elaborate women's paofu, guipao.

==== Baoyi bodai ====
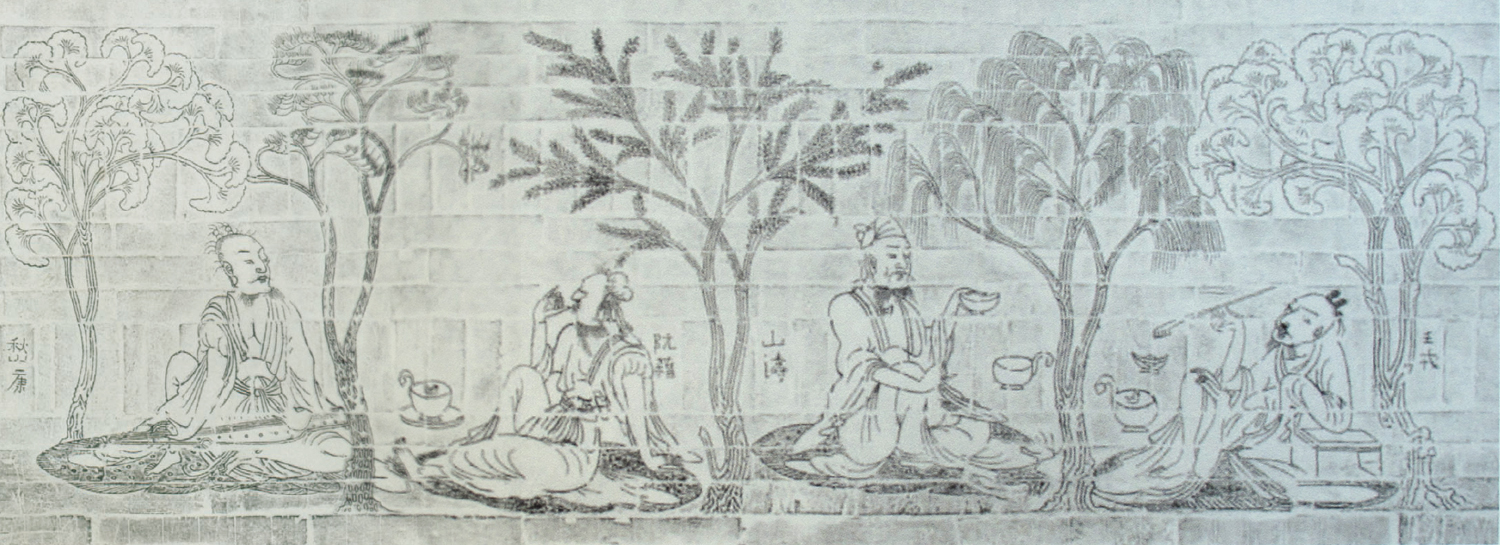
Baoyi bodai-style paofu from the Seven Sages of the Bamboo Grove, a tomb of the capital region of the Southern dynasties (5th-6th. c.).

The baoyi bodai was a type of loose paofu with long ribbons for men. The baoyi bodai gave its wearer a casual and simple appearance. Loose type of clothing was often worn during leisure times as found in the depictions of the Seven Sages of the Bamboo Grove where men had their upper clothing open, allowed their inner garment to be exposed, a knotted belt or sash which would tied to the upper garment at the chest level, and their skirts and lower garment would be held by a belt made of clothing which would be knotted at the front of the lower garment.

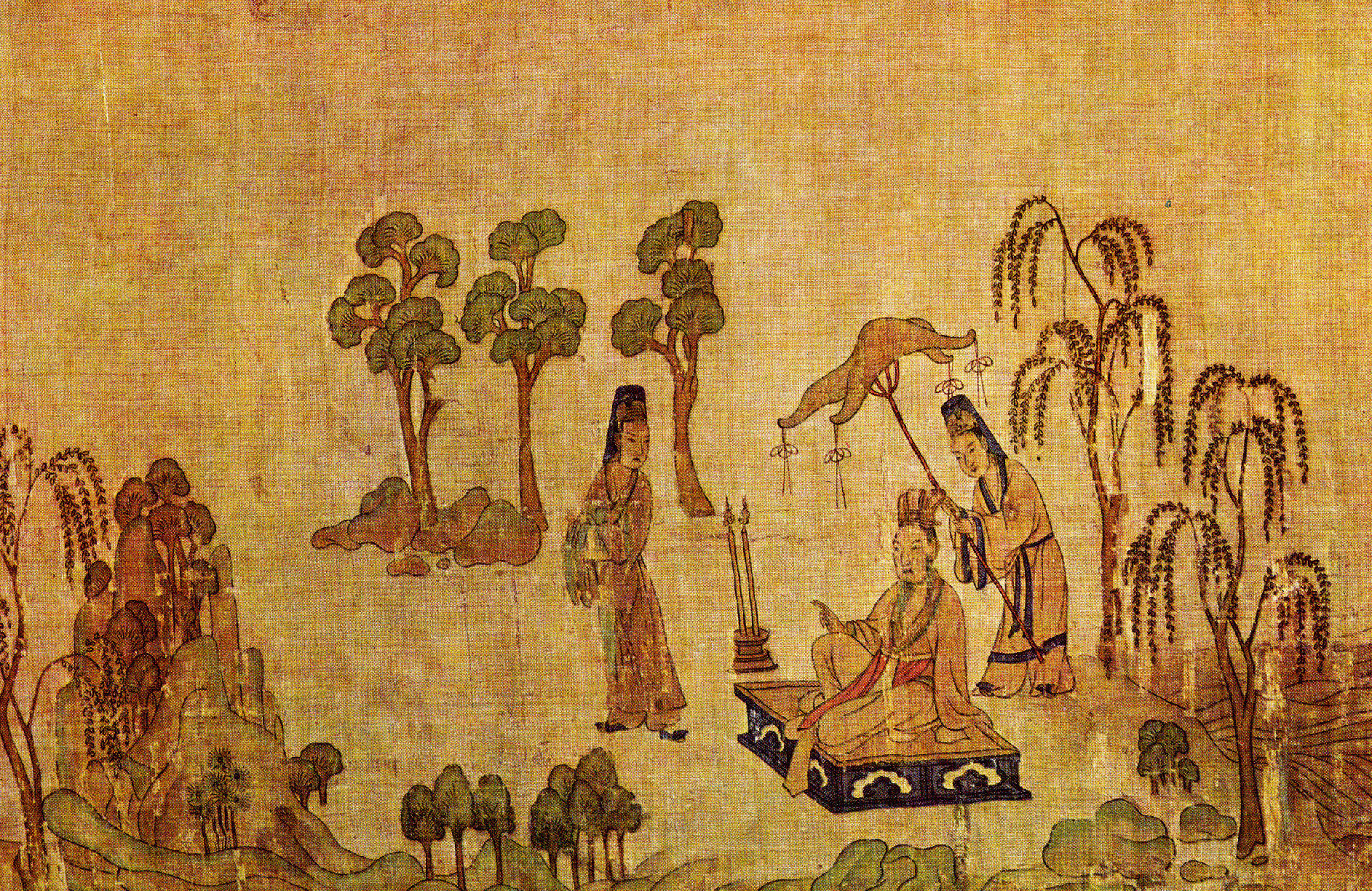
Men wearing loose jiaolingpao depicted in the Nymph of the Luo River by Gu Kaizhi

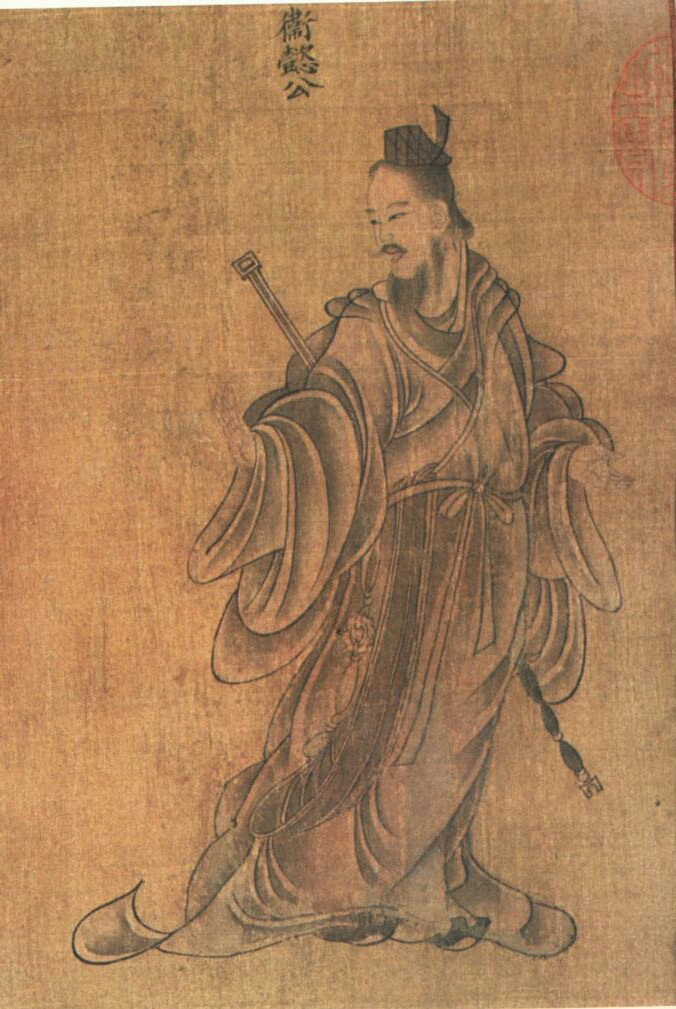
Loose jiaolingpao with large sleeves, by Gu Kaizhi.

The baoyi bodai-style appears to have been a Northern Chinese style instead of a Southern Chinese style. The baoyi bodai-style eventually became fashionable in the South. Loose jiaolingpao with flowing, loose sleeves was a popular style among men from diverse social strata in the Eastern Jin and in the Southern dynasties period; a bixi was sometimes attached to the waist of the paofu.

The baoyi bodai style also appeared on the images of Buddha which dates from the late 5th century AD. The baoyi bodai style appears to have been a direct consequence of Emperor Xiaowen's Sinicization reforms in 486 AD. The popularity of the baoyi bodai style was very high, and it eventually replaced the Indian-style clothing (i.e. sanghati) which used to be depicted on the Buddha.

=== Sui and Tang dynasties ===
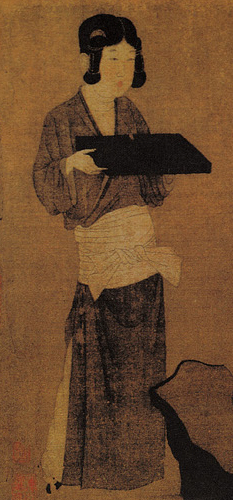
A woman wearing a jiaolingpao, Tang dynasty

In the Tang dynasty, the jiaolingpao evolved into a paofu with a round collar, referred as yuanlingpao or panling lanshan. However, Tang dynasty women also continued to wear long and loose jiaolingpao which was tied and knotted with a large sash at the hipline.

=== Ming dynasty ===
In Ming dynasty, the jiaolingpao continued to be worn by commoner men; it was worn with an undershirt, loose trousers (ku), and a sash around the waist. Other specific forms of paofu also coexisted such as: daopao, yuanlingpao, zhiduo, zhishen, and panling lanshan, etc.

== Derivatives and influences ==
=== Japan ===
The kimono was based on a type of Chinese pao which was popular in the 8th century AD Japanese court.

=== Korea ===
Chinese-style po (Korean: 포; Hanja: 袍; RR: po; MR: p'o) influenced by the Han dynasty coexisted together with the native Korean po during the Three Kingdom period. The po influenced by the Han dynasty either had a straight collar crossing at the front, which is referred as jingnyeong gyoim (Korean: 직령교임; Hanja: 直領交衽; RR: Jiknyeonggyoim), or had a straight collar which does not overlap at the front, which is referred as jingnyeong daeim (Korean: 직령대임; RR: jingnyeongdaeim); the sleeves of the Chinese-style po were also long enough to cover the back of the hands; the robe could reach the ankle-level or longer, and could even trail on the ground.

During the Goguryeo period, a form of paofu, which was the precursor of the durumagi, was adopted and worn by the upper class of Goguryeo in various forms for ceremonies and rituals.

The dallyeong (Korean: 단령; Hanja: 團領; RR: dallyeong; MR: tallyŏng) originated from the Chinese's yuanlingpao; it was introduced from the Tang dynasty was introduced during the Silla period.

== See also ==
- Hanfu
- List of Hanfu
- Shenyi
- Swallow-tailed Hems and Flying Ribbons clothing
- Ru – Chinese upper garment
