= Panling Lanshan =

Chinese clothing

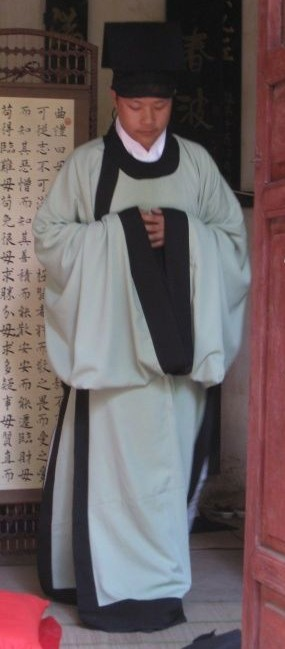
- Panling lanshan worn by scholars' and students' formal wear

Chinese name
- Chinese: 盤領襴衫
Transcriptions
Standard Mandarin
- Hanyu Pinyin: Pánlǐng lánshān

Alternative Chinese name
- Chinese: 襴衫
Transcriptions
Standard Mandarin
- Hanyu Pinyin: lánshān

Korean name
- Hangul: 난삼
- Hanja: 襴(幱/欄)衫
Transcriptions
- Revised Romanization: Namsam

Panling lanshan (Chinese: 盤領襴衫), also referred to as lanshan (襴衫), is a traditional Chinese attire for men. It is a specific form of round collar robe, known as yuanlingpao, which is characterized with the use of hem, called hanglan (横襕), also referred as lan (襕). The panling lanshan was a new type of garment, developed in the Northern and Southern dynasties through the localization of the round-collar garments which had been introduced by the ethnic minorities, such as the Xianbei. Panling lanshan continued to be worn in the Tang dynasty. The panling lanshan along with the futou (幞頭; "black cap") was used as the Tang dynasty attire of scholars and officials. The scholars' attire in the succeeding dynasties followed the style of the panling lanshan of the Tang dynasty. It is also a formal attire worn by scholars and students (生員) taking the imperial examination in Ming dynasty.

== History ==
Round collar robes, including the panling (盤領) robes, were introduced during the Northern and Southern dynasties by the Xianbei. The panling robes introduced by the Xianbei became a form of daily clothing for the Han Chinese during this period; it was then sinicized and fully integrated into the Han Chinese Clothing system through the adoption of Han Chinese tradition, such as the lan (seam) at the hem and basing itself on the shenyi-making system. It was further developed and standardized in the succeeding dynasties: Tang, Song, and Ming dynasties.

In the Tang dynasty, the lanshan had narrow sleeves inheriting the northern dynasty clothing system. The lanshan worn with by scholars and officials in this period was red in colour, and it was worn with a hat called futou.

In the Song dynasty, the lanshan developed wide sleeves and the robe became increasingly wider as it returned to a more traditional Han Chinese style due to the shift in preferences for civilization over militarism. The lanshan also changed in colour becoming white or off-white.

White lanshan continued to be worn in the Ming dynasty. A new form of lanshan also appeared in the Ming dynasty and was blue in colour'

== Design and construction ==
=== Panling lanshan for scholars ===
The panling lanshan lanshan for scholars is wide sleeved, has black edges, and has a round collar secured with a button. A crossed-collar undergarment must be worn beneath it. It may or may not have side slits (with side panels (暗擺) to conceal the undergarment).

Lanshan (襴衫), a vectorization of an illustration from the Chinese encyclopedia Complete Classics Collection of Ancient China (古今圖書集成).

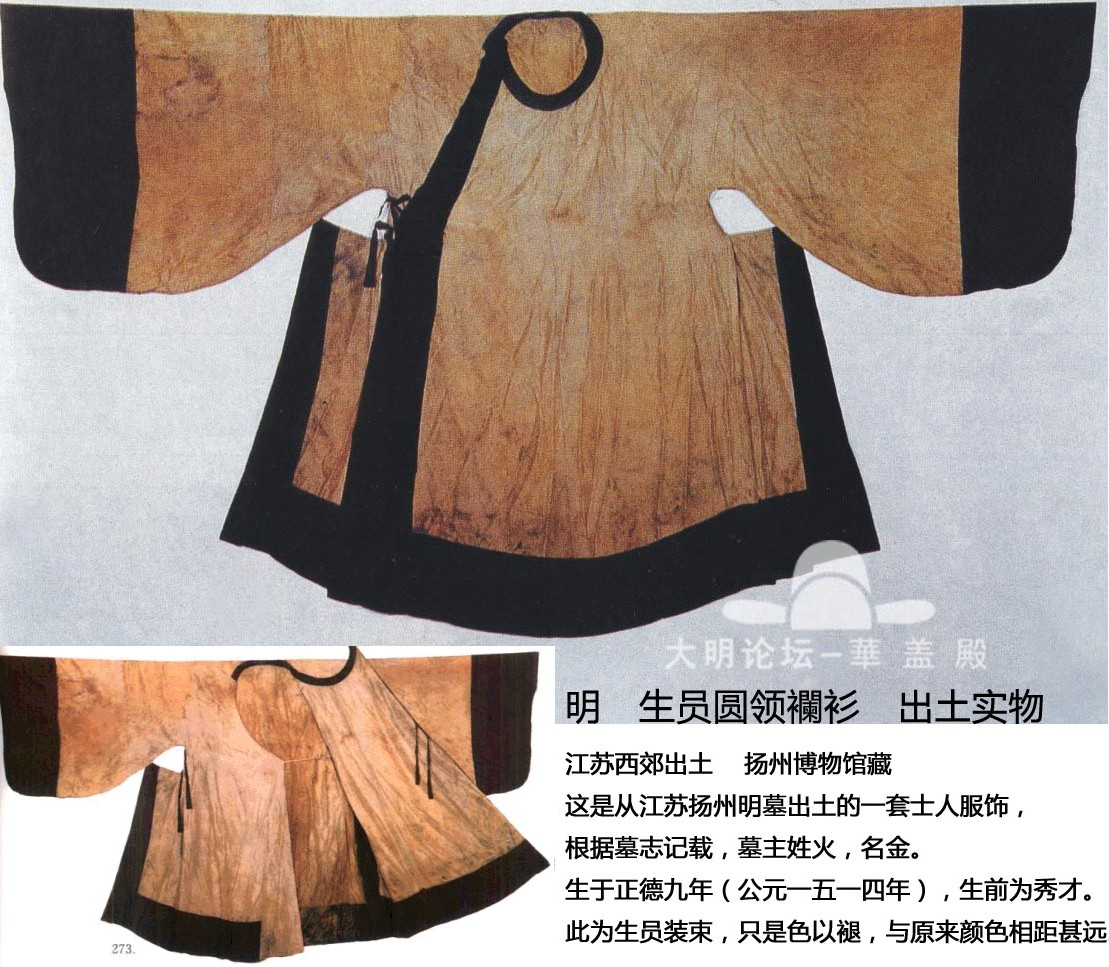
Artifact of panling lanshan

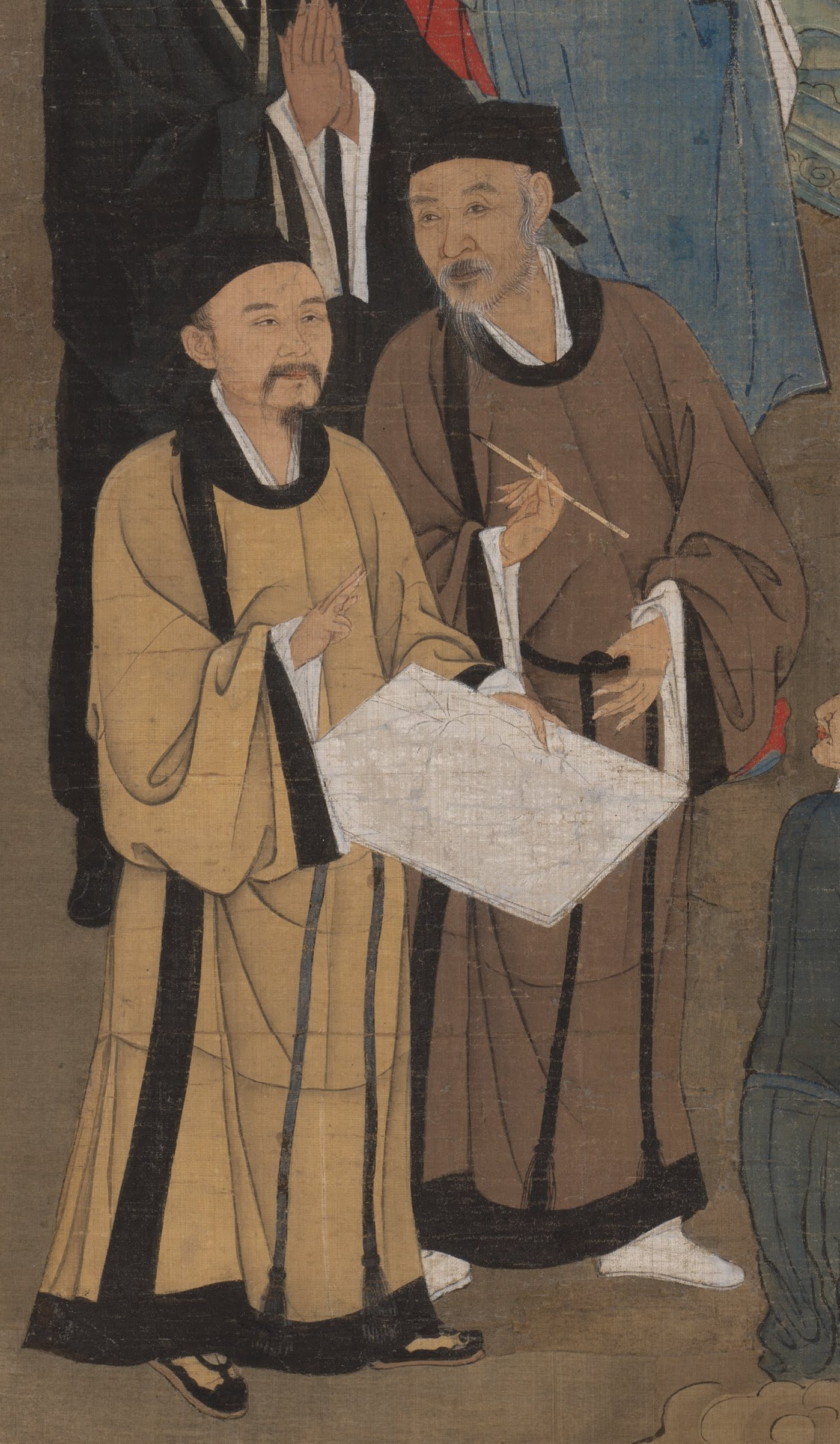
Portrait of man wearing Song-style panling lanshan

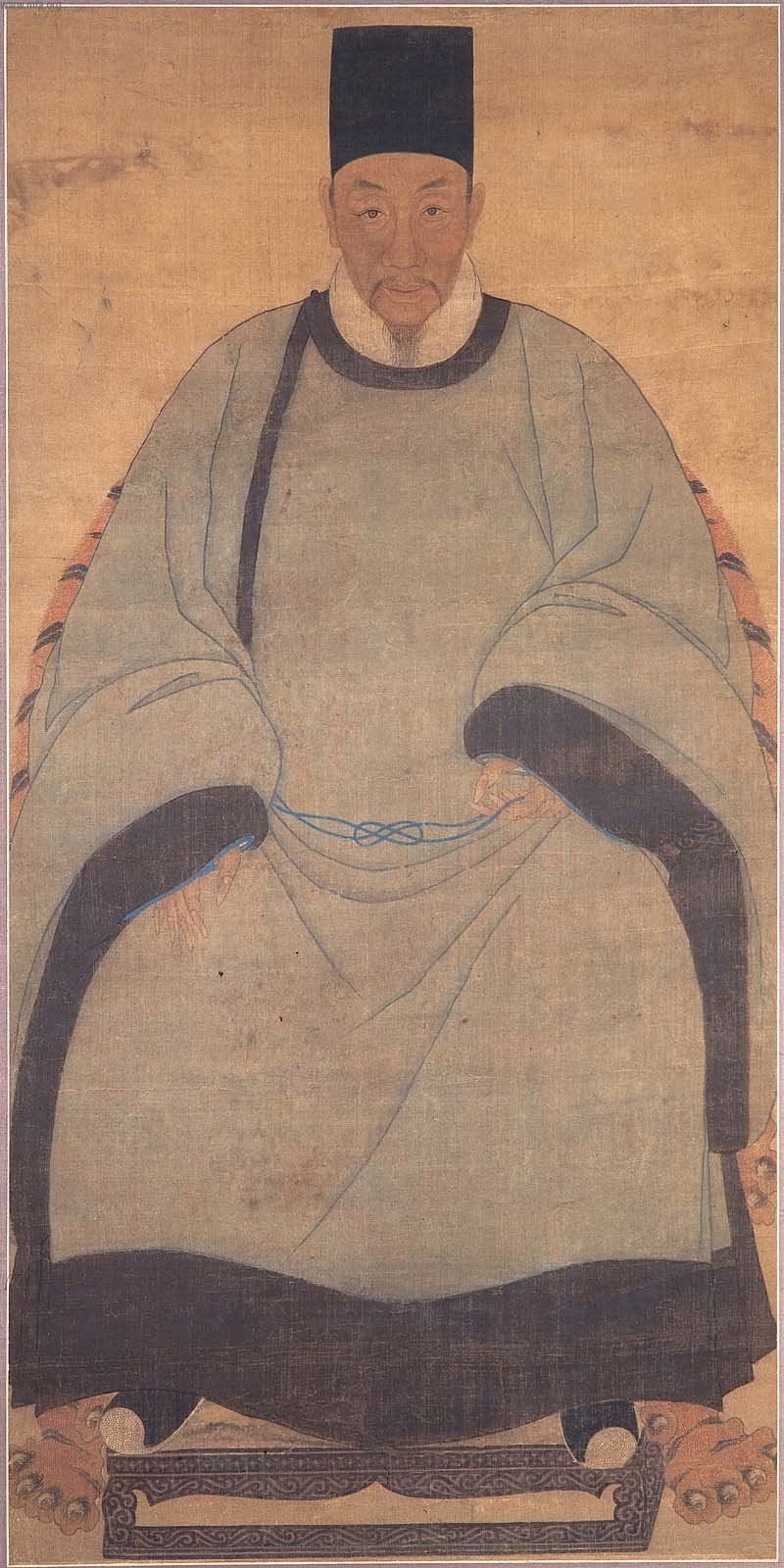
Ming dynasty man wearing panling lanshan.

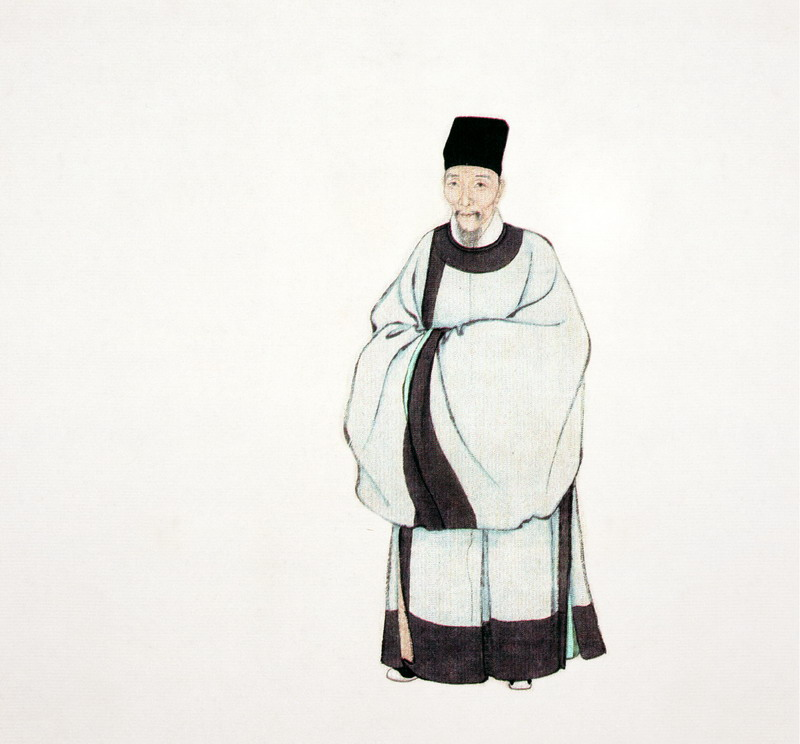

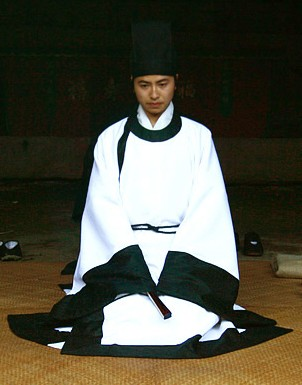
Man wearing panling lanshan

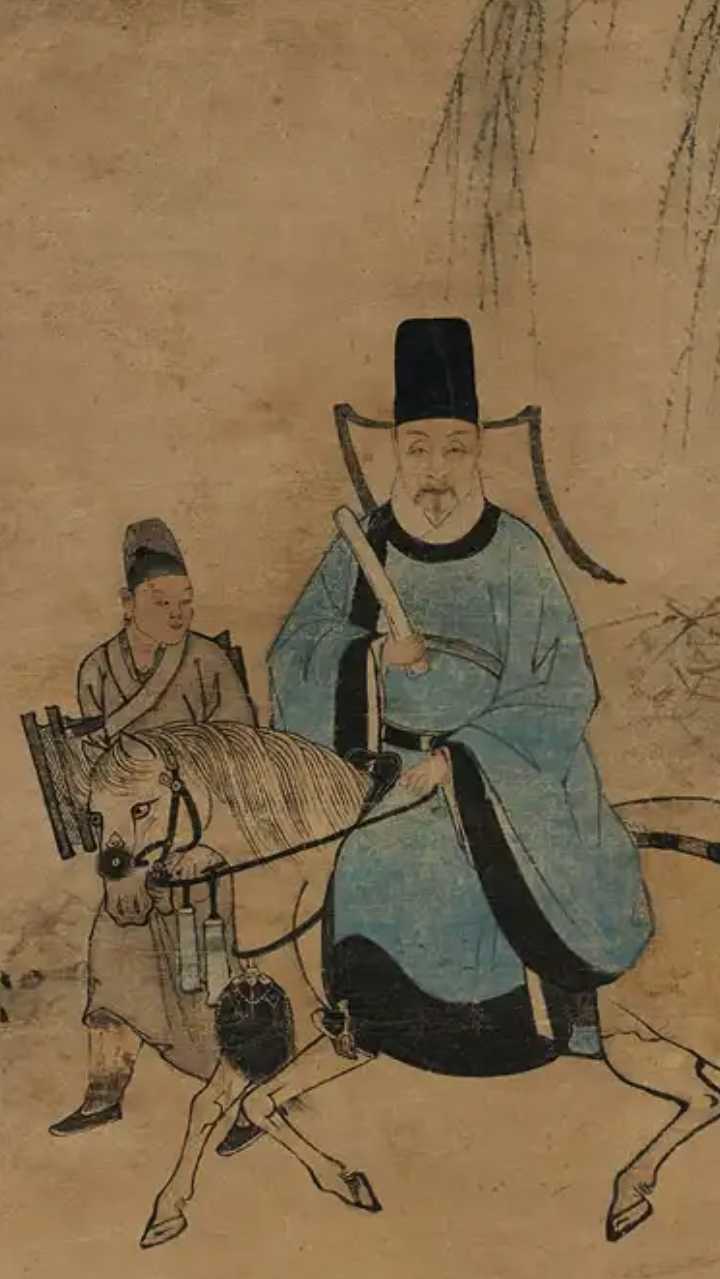
Feng Cong Wu (1556－1627 AD), politician of the Ming dynasty.

== Korean version ==
In Korea, the lanshan was called nansam (Korean: 난삼; Hanja: 襴(幱/欄)衫). The nansam was adopted from the ancient Chinese system and was worn as the official costume of students who had passed the civil service examination in Joseon by King Yeonjo.

In Joseon, students also wore a similar robe called aengsam (앵삼; 鶯衫). The aengsam appears to be similar to the Chinese nansam but with a different colour. The word aeng from aengsam is literally translated as "nightingale" due to its yellow colour which is the same as the colour of the nightingale. The aengsam was worn during the national government examination and governmental ceremonies as a type of formal clothing. It appears that the aengsam started to be worn in the late Joseon period.

== Similar looking garments ==
- Yuanlingshan
- Shenyi

== See also ==
- Han Chinese clothing
- List of Han Chinese clothing
- Fanlingpao - Lapel robes
