= Fanlingpao =

Lapel robes categorized as Hufu

- From left to right: fanlingpao, yuanlingpao, panling lanshan, Tang dynasty tomb murals.

Chinese name
- Chinese: 翻领袍
- Literal meaning: Lapel robe
Transcriptions
Standard Mandarin
- Hanyu Pinyin: Fānlǐngpáo

English name
- English: Lapel robes or Hufu

Fanlingpao (Chinese: 翻领袍; pinyin: fānlǐngpáo; lit. 'Lapel robe'), sometimes referred to as kuapao (Chinese: 袴袍) and hufu (Chinese: 胡服) in the Tang dynasty when they feature double overturned lapels, is a type of paofu with lapels. It was categorized as Hufu instead of Hanfu due to its association with clothing of the foreigners who came from the Silk road. Fanlingpao were first introduced in China during the Northern Wei dynasty and became popular in Northern Qi. The custom of wearing fanlingpao were then inherited and further developed in the Sui and Tang dynasties. The fanlingpao could be transformed into a round collar robe, called yuanlingpao, in the Tang dynasty through the use of buttons. The fanlingpao shows foreign influences, which are mostly likely from the Persian, Sassanian Persian, Iranian Sogdian, and Turkic. (Note: The Turks typically had lapel robes which closed on the left side.) Fanlingpao were popular fashion during Tang dynasty for both men and women and showed the popularity of Hufu-style clothing during this period; it was considered hufu while yuanlingpao was categorized as a form Hanfu.

== Terminology ==
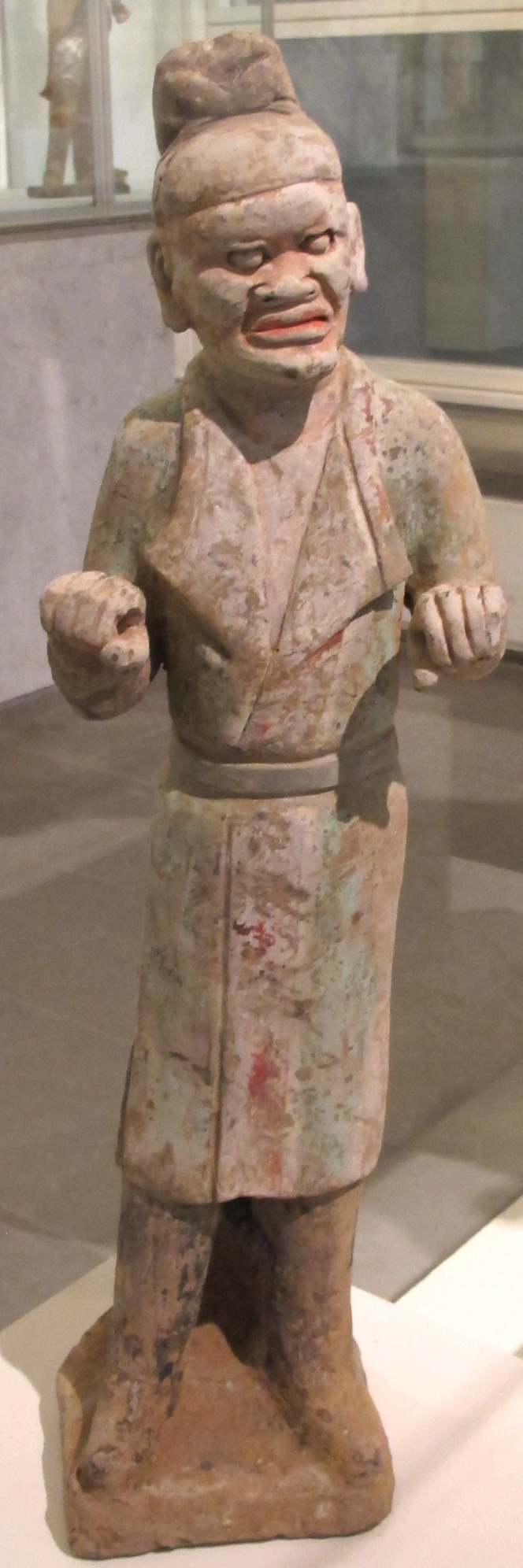
Foreigner's kuapao or hufu closes in the front, Tang dynasty

Double-overturned lapel kaftan-like robe were called kuapao and were referred as hufu in the Tang dynasty; kuapao was characterized with tight sleeves and double overturned lapels with short overlap which closes at the front in proximity to the centre of the body (or with a front opening). The kuapao could also be enriched with pattern trims or border decorations at the sleeves cuffs and along the lapels. In appearance, the kuapao looks similar to the kaftan with lapels and slim sleeves used by the Persian. This form of lapel robe originated from Central Asia and was typically worn by men.

The term kuapao was sometimes used to refer to double over-turned fanlingpao with tight sleeves, which overlaps at the front and closes on the right side of the body near the armpit in the Tang dynasty. (Note: Author Chen Buyun describes the kuapao as having a "front opening"; however, the images provided shows a double over-turned lapel robe which overlaps at the front and closes on the right side of the body near the armpit.) This form of overlapping closure to the right is a traditional Han Chinese characteristic, which was sometimes adopted by foreigners and/or non-Han Chinese, who had borrowed Chinese elements. (Note: This includes the Sogdians and the Turks, who typically closed their robes on the left side.)

== History ==
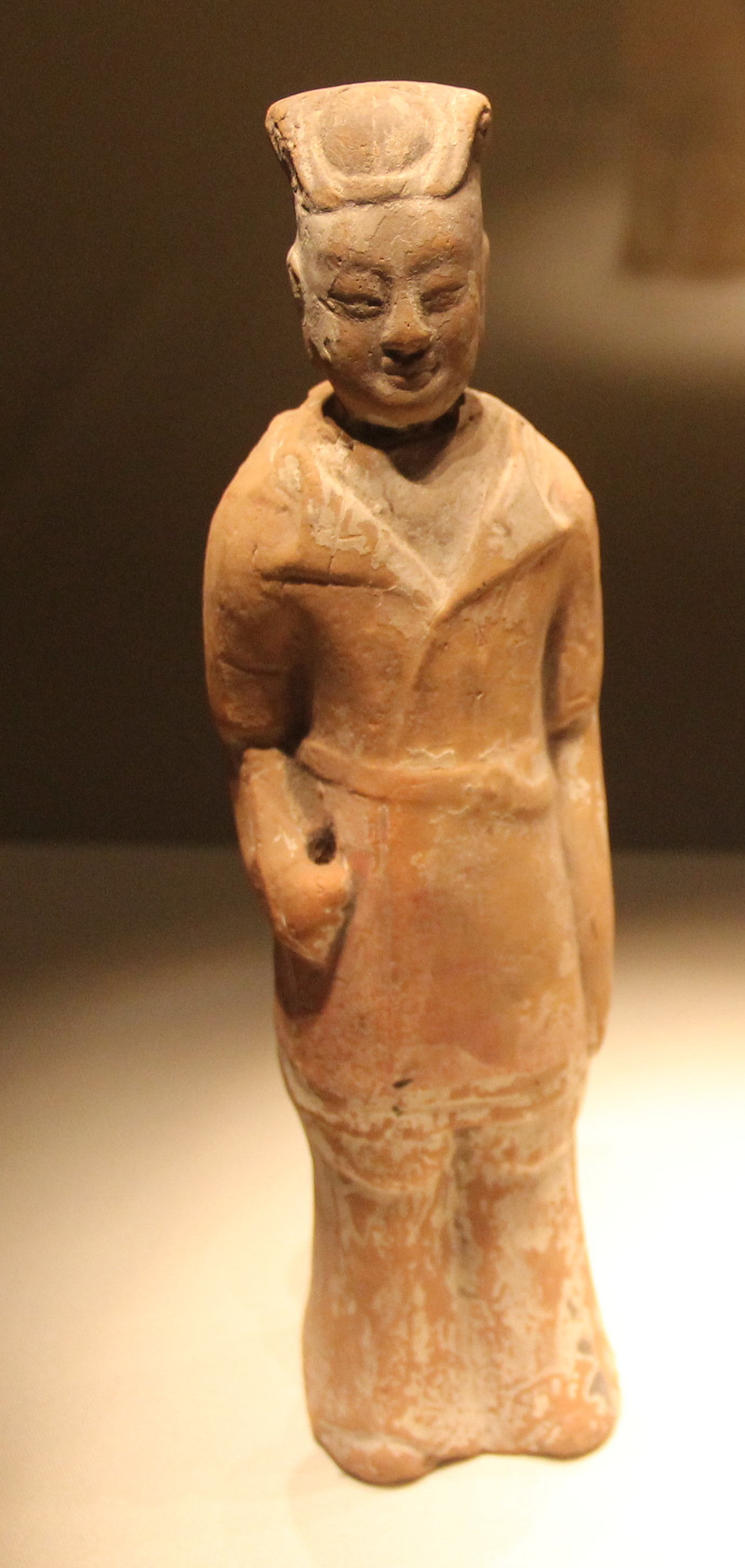
Fanlingpao overlapping and closing on the right side, Northern Wei dynasty.

Lapels robes originated from Western Asia and were popular in Central Asian in the Sogdian region, in Qiuci, and Gaochang. Lapels robes were spread eastward through the Sogdians. Lapel robes were first introduced in the north region of China during the Northern Wei dynasty. The earliest depictions of Xianbei and Han Chinese people wearing lapel robes in China also date back to the Northern Wei dynasty.

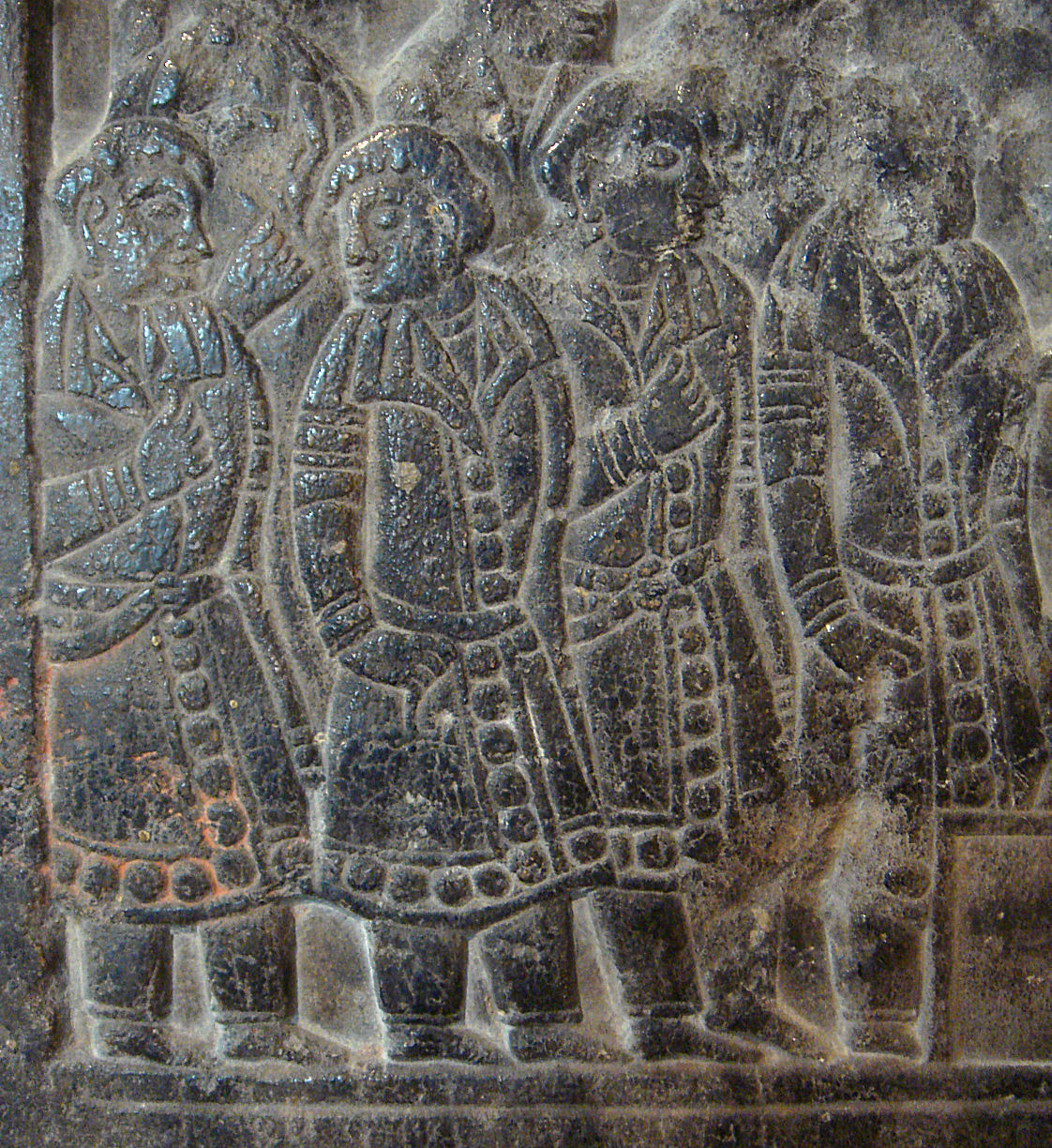
Sogdian wearing lapel robes (kuapao-style), Northern Qi. All of their robes overlap on the left side, except one at the far right, which is close on the right side. They close at the centre of the body

The Sogdians, who lived in China, were most influential between the second half of the 6th century and the beginning of the 7th century. The Sogdians and their descendants (mostly from the merchant class) who lived in China during this period also wore a form of knee-length, yuanlingpao-like kaftan that retained their own ethnic characteristics but also showed some influences from East Asia (i.e., Chinese and early Turks). (Note: Sogdian men wore Sogdian clothing but not their women. According to the Yi Zhou Shu, Sogdian women used the Chinese clothing. The manner these men wore their Sogdian robes were not exactly the same as the way they dress themselves in their motherland, Sogdia.)

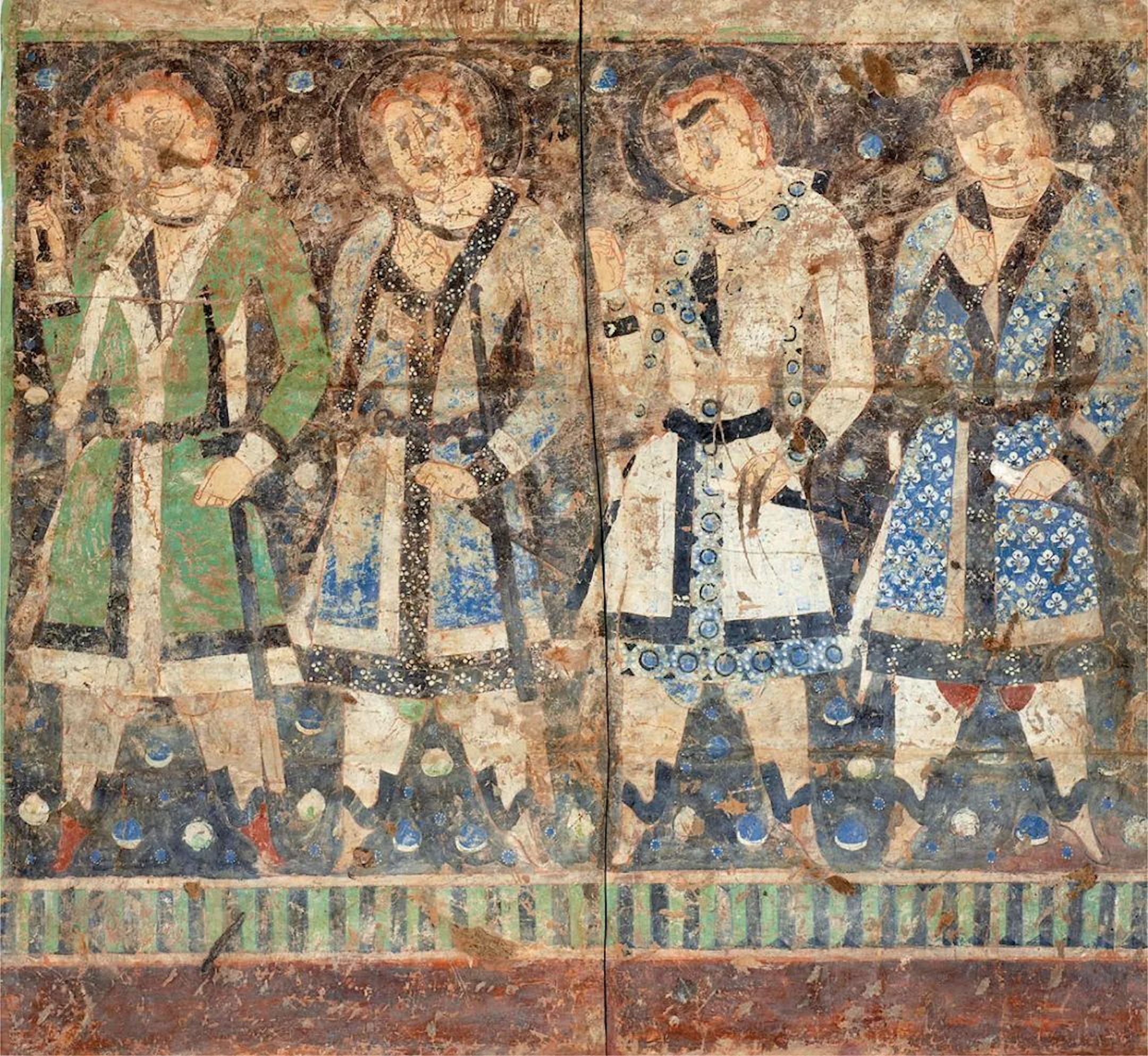
Non-Chinese lapel robe (only one lapel down) with short overlap on the left closing on the front, Kizil caves.

Under the influence and the demands of the Chinese population, as well as Chinese traditions, most Sogdian attire in China had to be closed to the right. Their robes were versatile, it could often be transformed into a yuanlingpao-like robe by buttoning up the neck to form the round collar or occasionally have their lower button undone allowing their collars to be form lapels, becoming lapel robes. (Note: They would wear their kaftans button-up more often and only button off for certain activities or occupation (such as dancers, hunters, etc).) The Sogdians in China and Sogdia had both lapels down following the Iranian tradition or the tradition of the Saka people living in the Khotan Oasis. (Note: Styling their robes in double lapels were not popular among the Turks of the Great Turkic Qaghanate (552–630) but were worn by the Sogdians in Sogdia and in China.) It was however not rare for Chinese Sogdians to wear their robes with only the left lapel, which was a distinguishing feature as the only left lapel robe was rarely found (almost unknown) in Sogdia. By the Northern Qi dynasty, lapel robes had become popular in the Han Chinese regions and were worn by both men and women. The wearing custom lapel robes were then inherited and further developed in the Sui and Tang dynasties.

=== Sui and Tang dynasties ===
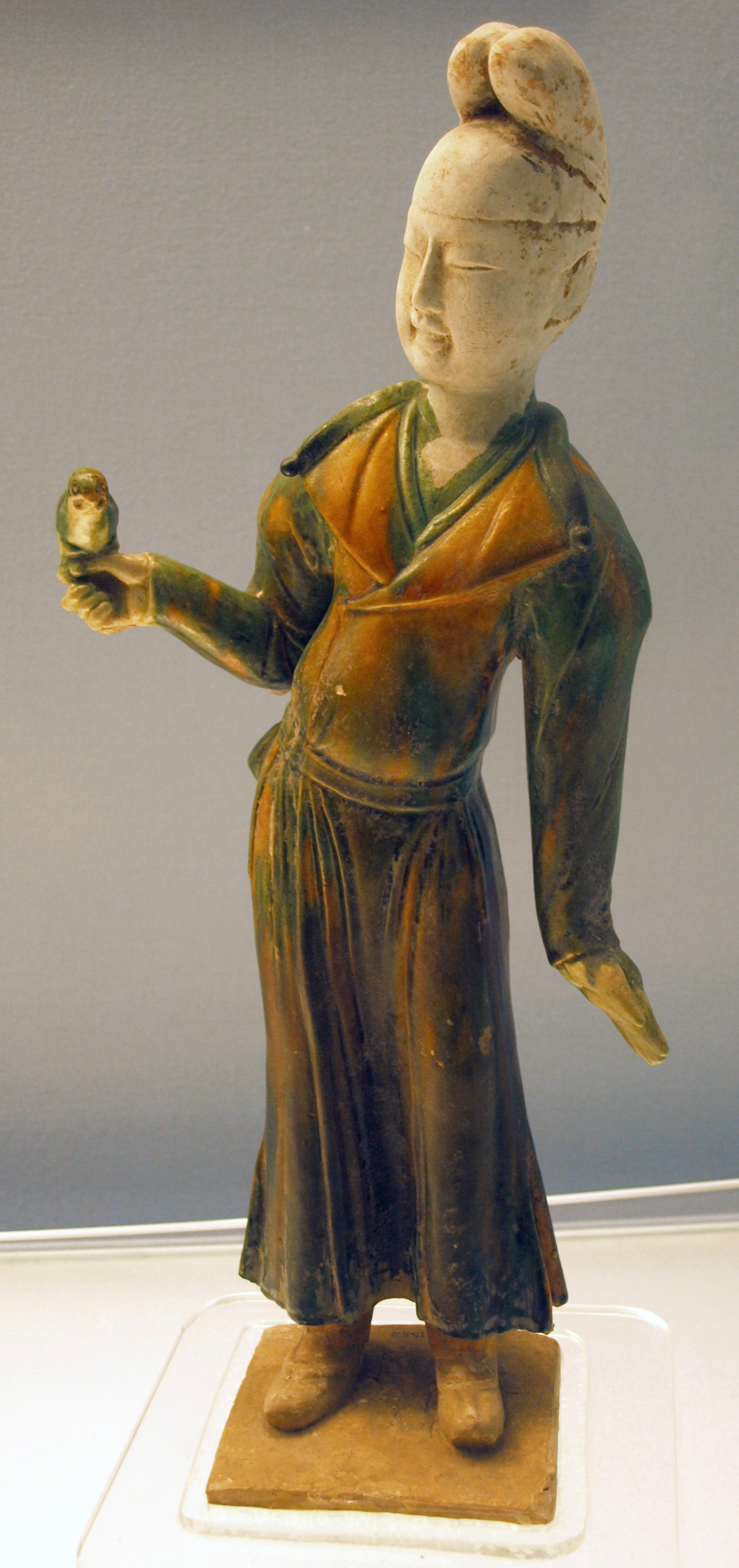
Woman wearing a fanlingpao (kuapao-style), Hufu-style fashion, Tang dynasty

Fanlingpao worn during the Tang dynasty was categorized as Hufu. It was very popular in the Tang dynasty during the Kaiyuan and Tianbao era during the reign of Emperor Xuanzong. During the Tang dynasty, hufu was influenced by foreign cultures which came from the Silk road; most likely from the Persian, Sassanian Persian, Iranian Sogdian, and the Turkic people.

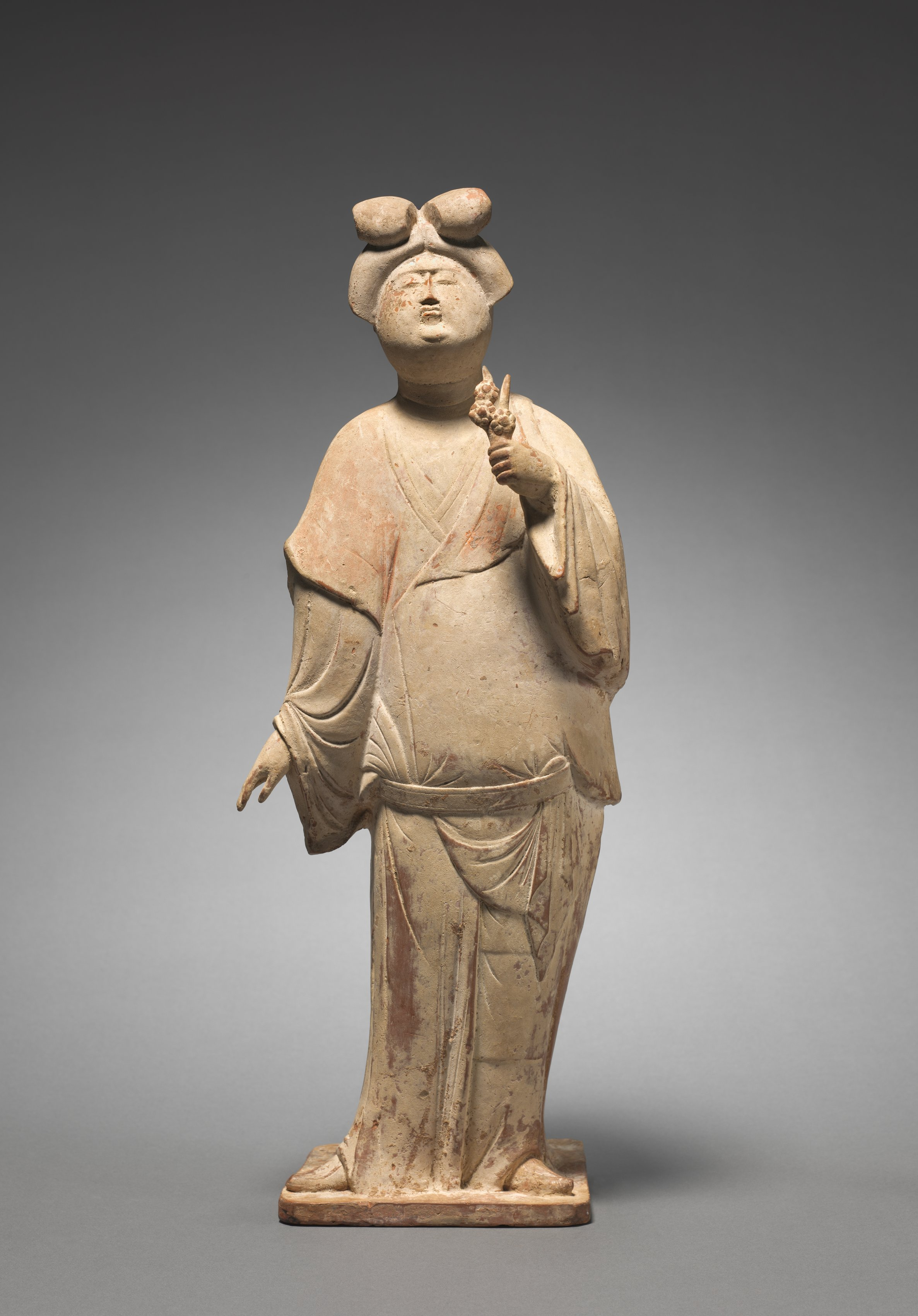
Fanlingpao, Tang dynasty

From the 7th to the 8th century, the kuapao and fanlingpao-like robes were popular; it was especially popular during the Wuzetian period (684 –704 AD). The fanlingpao of the preceding dynasties were further developed in the Tang dynasty; such that it could be transformed into the yuanlingpao by buttoning up three buttons on the collar. It overlaps and closed to the right side, which follows the traditional Han Chinese system. While adopting certain elements from foreign dress (e.g. Sogdian and Turk lapel robes), the Chinese however maintain their traditional way of closing their fanglingpao on the right side. The kuapao was also worn by women, who would wear it to cross-dress as men. It could be used as a jacket and was thrown over the shoulders like a cloak, which made women looked more masculine. It was worn with stripped trousers and leather waist-belt with leather strip attached to the belt. (Note: According to Gao et al (1987), this type of leather belt was also originated from northern minorities and was introduced in Central plain during the Wei and Jin period.)

==== Huihuzuang ====
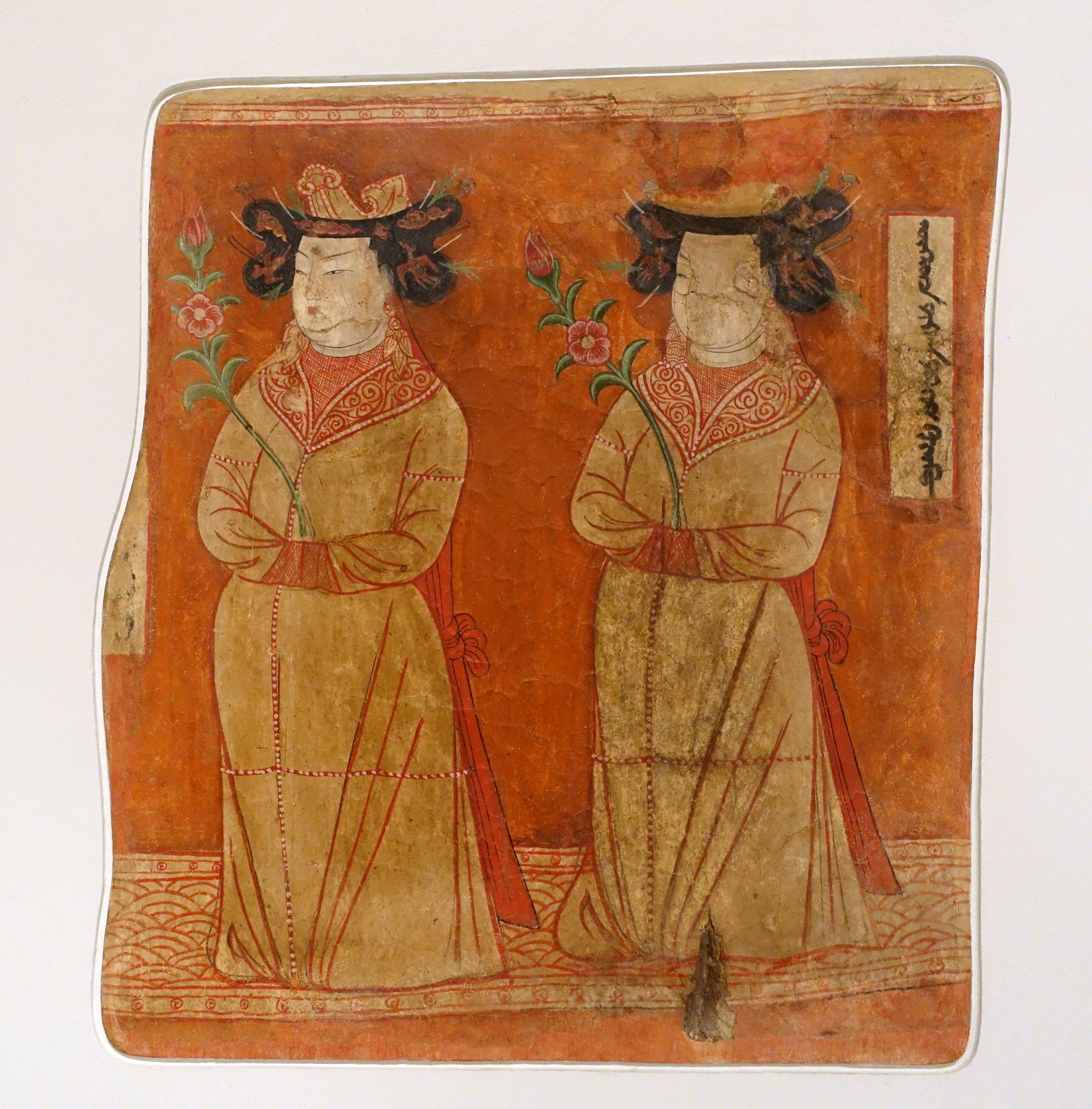
Uyghur lapel robes, c. 8th-9th century.

A new style of fanlingpao which was classified as a Uyghur dress was worn by the 9th century; this form of fanlingpao also had turned-down lapels, but they were also different from the previous lapel robes. It was long enough to reach the ground, voluminous, and the sleeves were slim-fitting. This form of lapel robe was referred as Huihuzhuang (回鶻装; "costumes in Uyghur style"); the Huihu were the predecessors of the Uyghur. The Huihuzhuang was produced for the women of Han ethnic and had been inspired by the robes of Huihu women. The upper part of the robe was loose and had decorative patterns (or borders) on the collar and sleeves cuffs. Based on the reconstruction from the Dunhuang frescoes, the Huihuzhuang had an overlapping front which could be closed with ties on the right or left side. Warm, colours were preferred, and the colour red was typically used; it was also generally made of thick brocade. The Huihuzhuang was very popular among the Tang dynasty's aristocratic women and the women of the imperial court. The rise of Uyghur-style robe occurred after the rebellion of An Lushan, when Uyghur culture grew along with their military power.

== Gallery ==
Fanlingpao and kuapao in the Sui and Tang dynasties

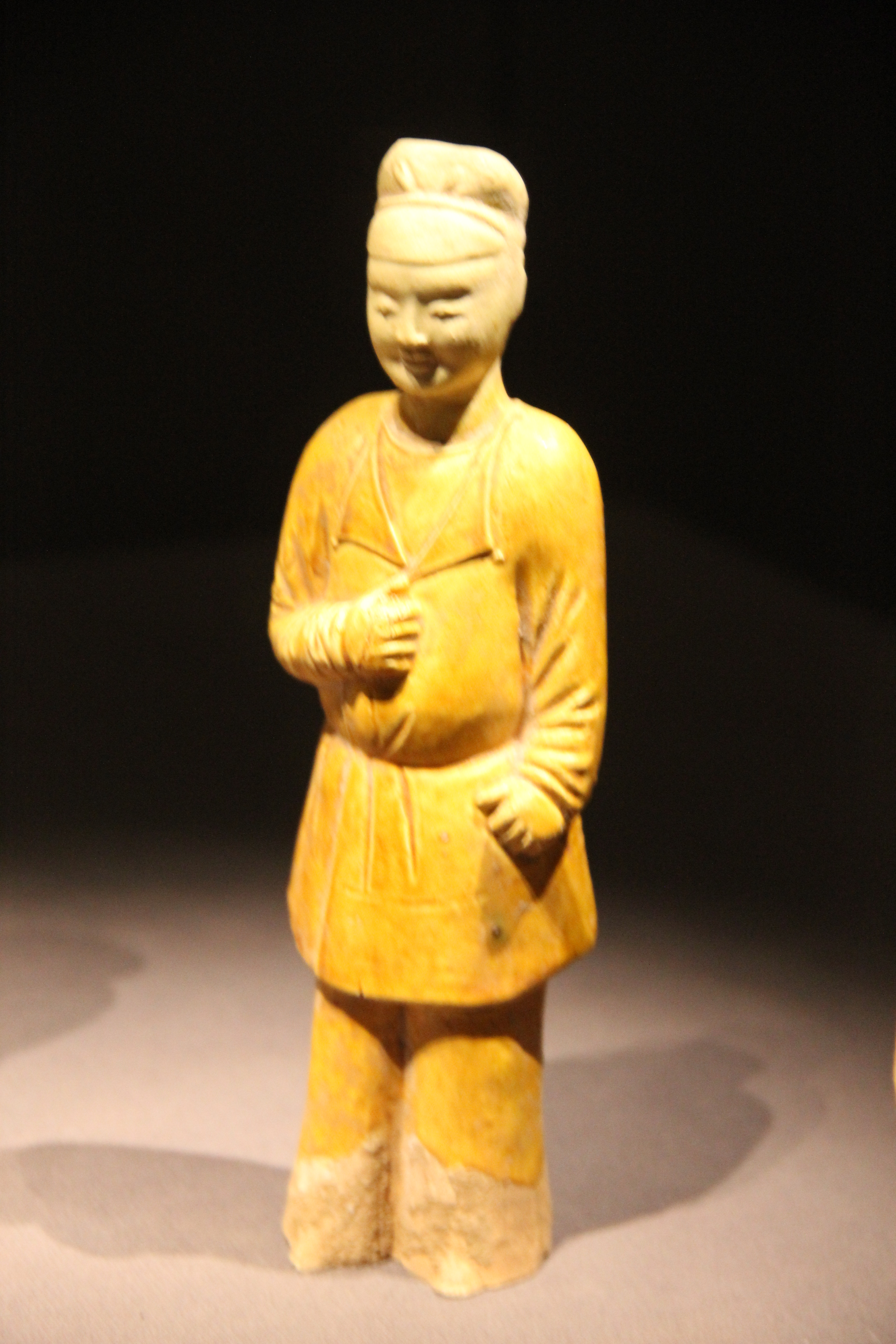
Attendant wearing lapel robe (right overlap and closes at the front), Sui dynasty

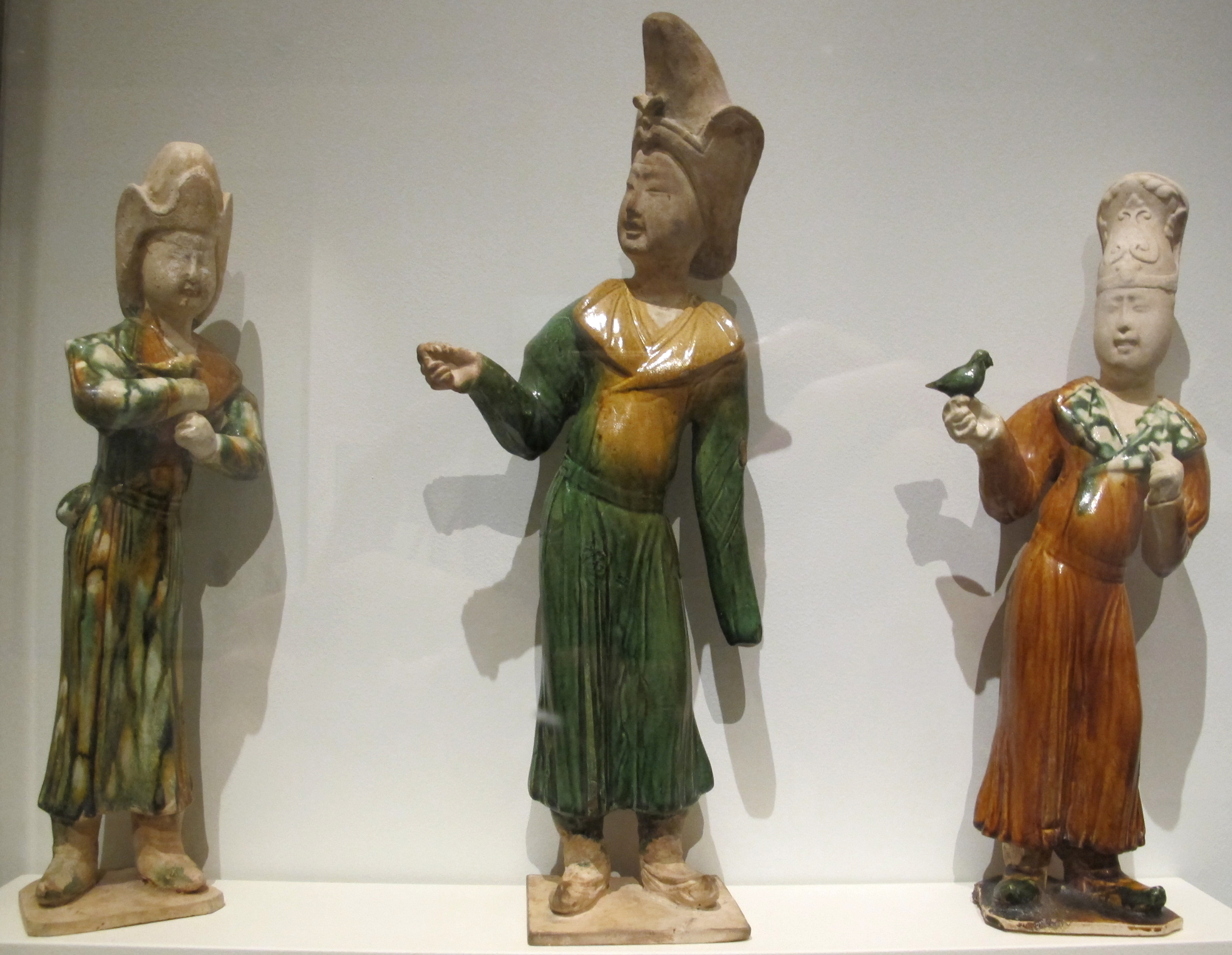
Sancai figures wearing fanlingpao (kuapao-style), overlaps on the right and closes to the right, Tang dynasty.

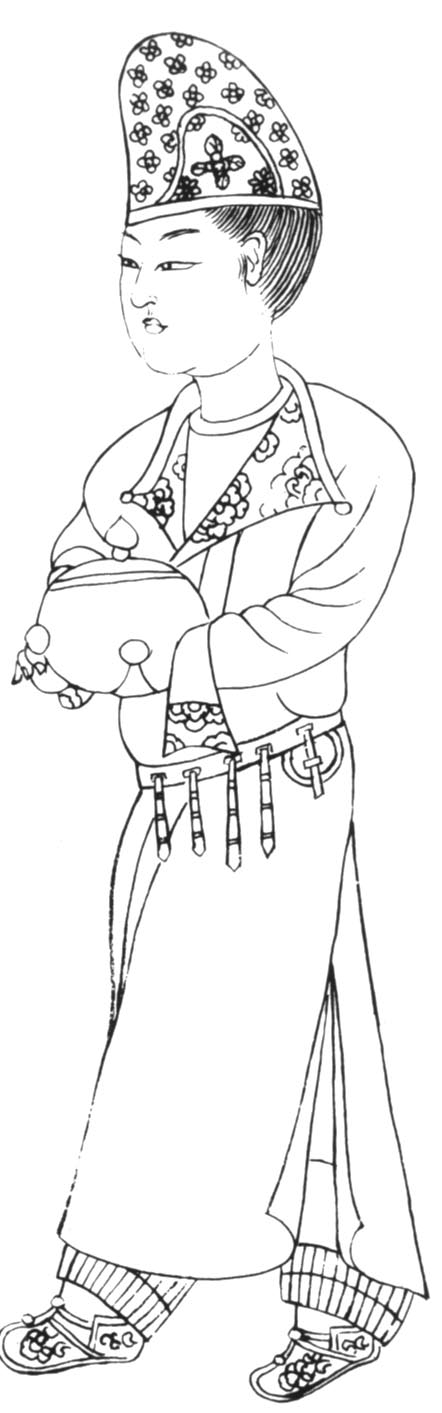
Tang dynasty woman wearing kuapao, a hufu-style fashion.

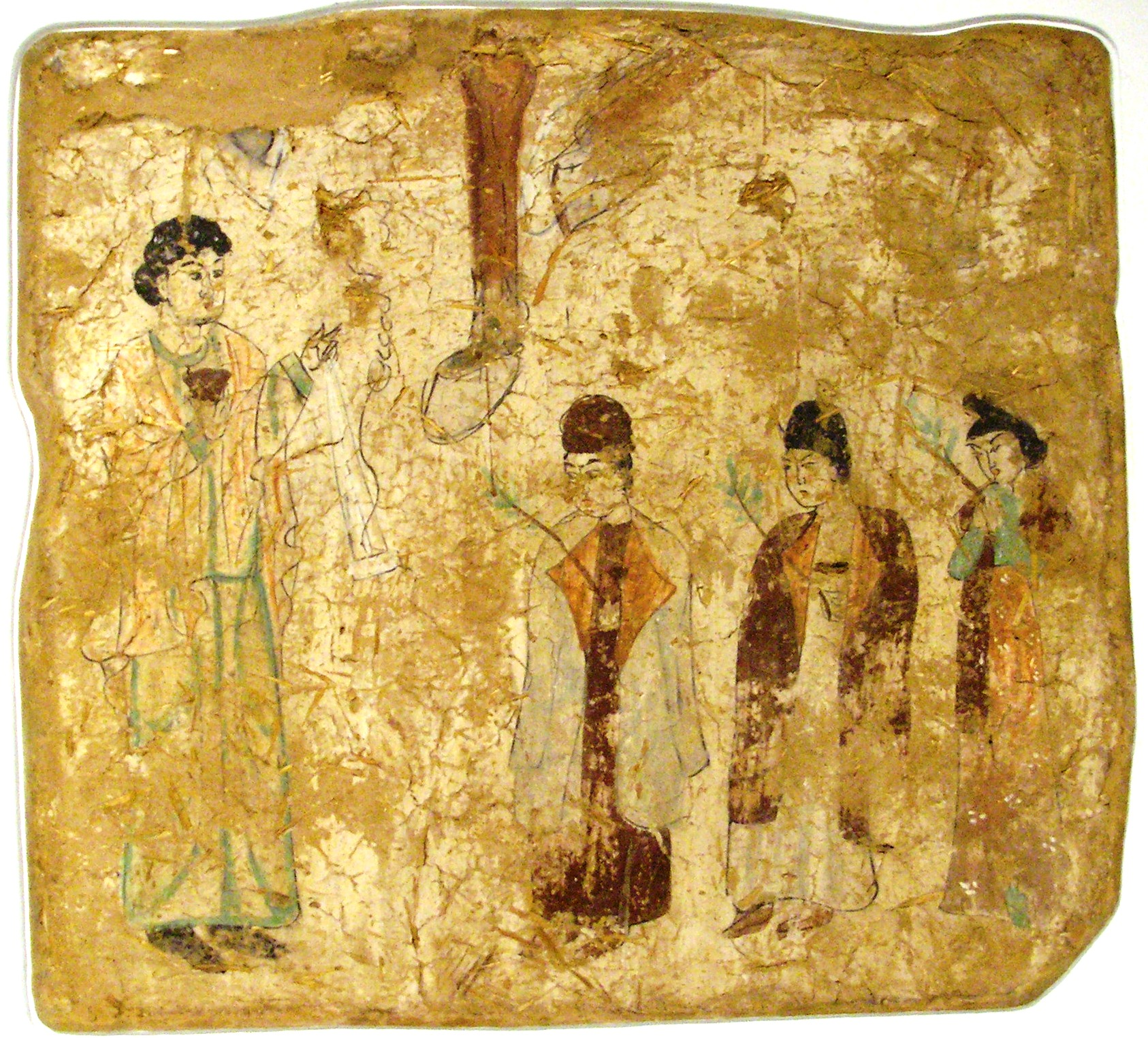
Kuapao worn as a cloak

== See also ==
- Yuanlingshan
- Panling Lanshan
- Kaftan
- Hufu
- Han Chinese clothing
- List of Han Chinese clothing
