= Round collar robe =

Round collar robe worn in East Asia

- Emperor Duzong of Song dynasty, wearing round collar robe.

Chinese name
- Simplified Chinese: 圆领袍
- Traditional Chinese: 圓領袍
- Literal meaning: Round collar robe
Transcriptions
Standard Mandarin
- Hanyu Pinyin: yuán lǐng páo
- Wade–Giles: yuan^{2}
- IPA: [ɥɛ̌nlìŋpʰǎʊ]
Yue: Cantonese
- Yale Romanization: jyun lìhng pòuh
- Jyutping: jyun4 ling5 pou4
- IPA: [jyn˩lɪŋ˩˧pʰɔw˩]
Southern Min
- Hokkien POJ: îⁿ-léng-pô
- Tâi-lô: îⁿ-léng-pô

Japanese name
- Kanji: 袍
Transcriptions
- Revised Hepburn: hou
- Kunrei-shiki: hō

Korean name
- Hangul: 단령
- Hanja: 團領
Transcriptions
- Revised Romanization: dallyeong
- McCune–Reischauer: tallyŏng

Vietnamese name
- Vietnamese alphabet: áo cổ cồn áo viên lĩnh/lãnh
- Chữ Hán: 襖古乾 襖圓領

The Round collar robe, also called yuanlingpao (Chinese: 圆领袍; Chinese: 圓領袍; pinyin: yuánlǐngpáo; lit. 'round collar robe') and yuanlingshan in China, danryeong (Korean: 단령; Hanja: 團領; RR: dallyeong; MR: tallyŏng; simplified Chinese: 团领; traditional Chinese: 團領; pinyin: tuánlǐng; lit. 'round collar') in Korea, was a style of paofu, a Chinese robe, worn in ancient China, which was long enough to cover the entire body of its wearer. The Chinese yuanlingpao was developed under the influences of the Hufu worn by the Donghu people and by the Wuhu (including the Xianbei). Depending on time period, the Chinese yuanlingpao also had some traces of influences from the Hufu worn by the Sogdian. The Chinese yuanlingpao continued to evolve, developing distinctive Chinese characteristics with time and lost its Hufu connotation. It eventually became fully integrated in the Hanfu system for the imperial and court dress attire. Under the influence of ancient China, the Chinese yuanlingpao was adopted by the rest of the East Asian cultural sphere.

== History ==
=== China ===
==== Tang Dynasty ====
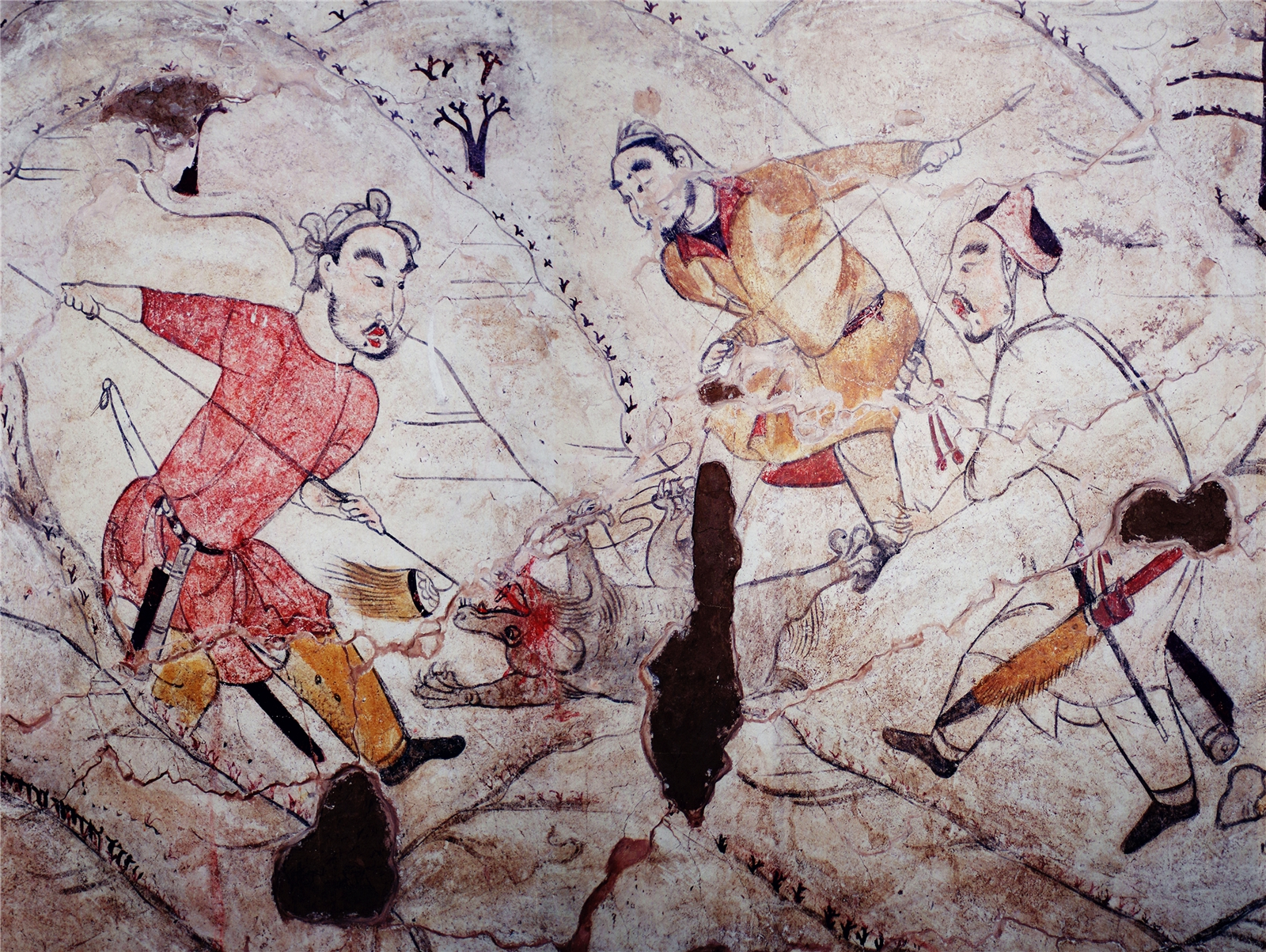
Xianbei people wearing round collar robes

The appearance of yuanling collars in Hanfu, including those used in the round collar robe, occurred during the Eastern Han dynasty where clothing with round collars started to be used as an inner garment under the Hufu of the Donghu people.

Later on, the clothing customs of the Chinese were further influenced by the Hufu-style clothing with round collars and narrow sleeves used in the Hufu of the Wuhu (including the Xianbei people) during the Six dynasties period, when clothing with yuanling collar started to be worn as an outer-garment and could be used as a form of formal clothing.

A form of localized yuanlingpao which was integrated with the traditional Chinese characteristics of the shenyi is the panling lanshan.

By the Tang dynasty, the yuanlingpao became a formal attire which was typically worn by men although it also became fashionable for women to wear it in some dynasties, such as in the Tang dynasty. During the Tang dynasty, under the influence of the Sogdians, the yuanlingpao could be transformed into a fanlingpao.

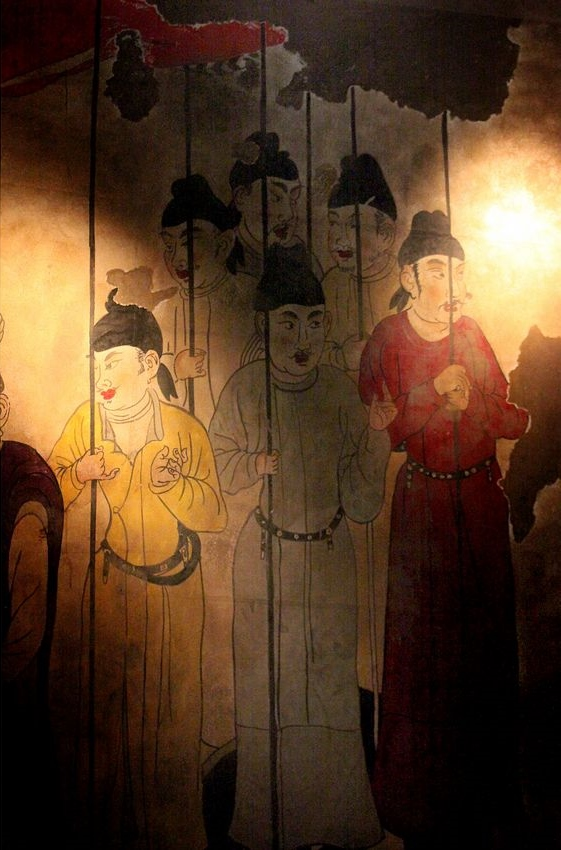
Three kinds of yuanlingpao: Fanlingpao (left), panling lanshan (middle), yuanlingshan(right), Tang dynasty

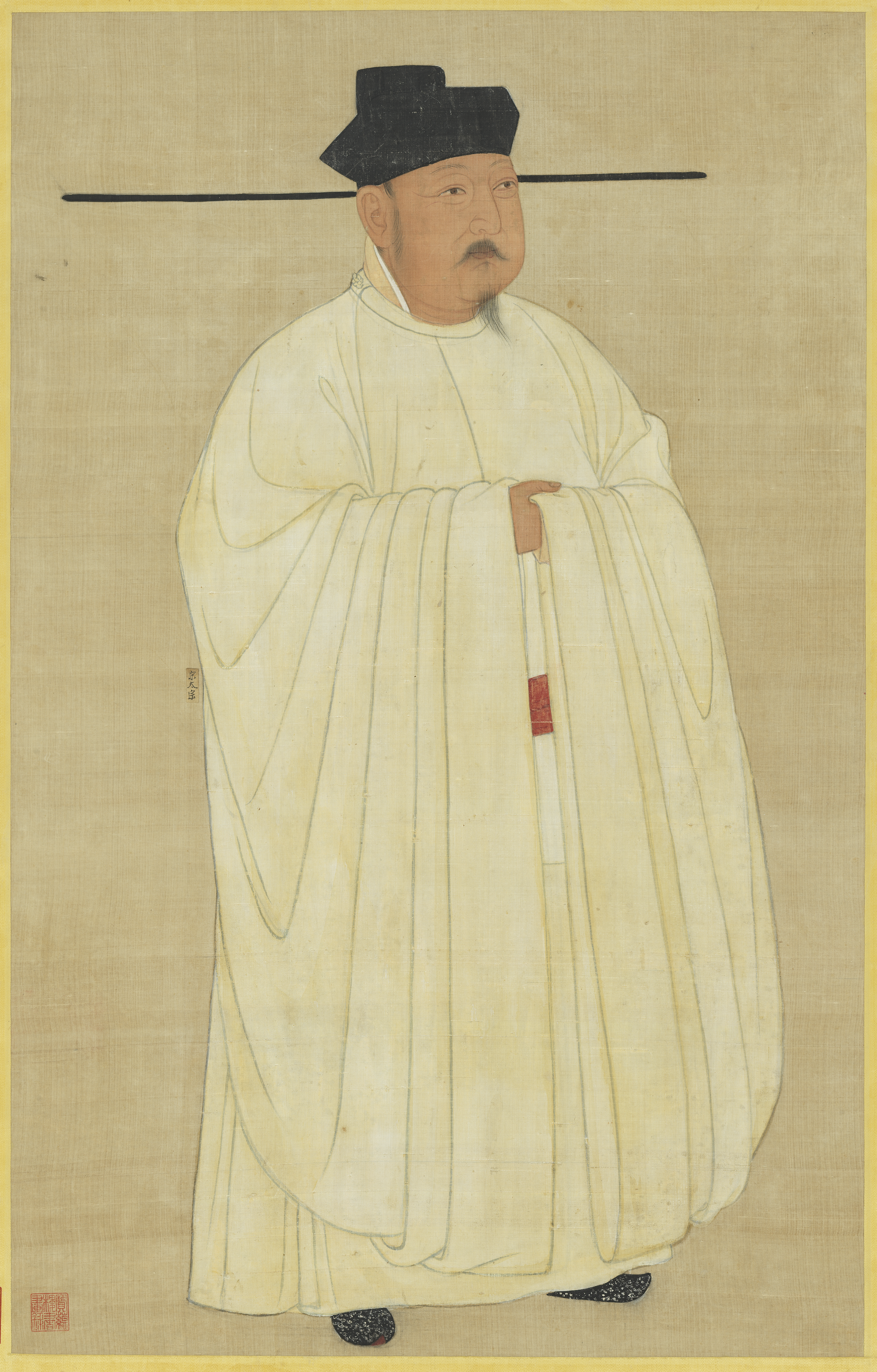
Yuanlingpao with broad and loose sleeves, Song dynasty

Yuanlingpao as a dragon robe, Ming dynasty

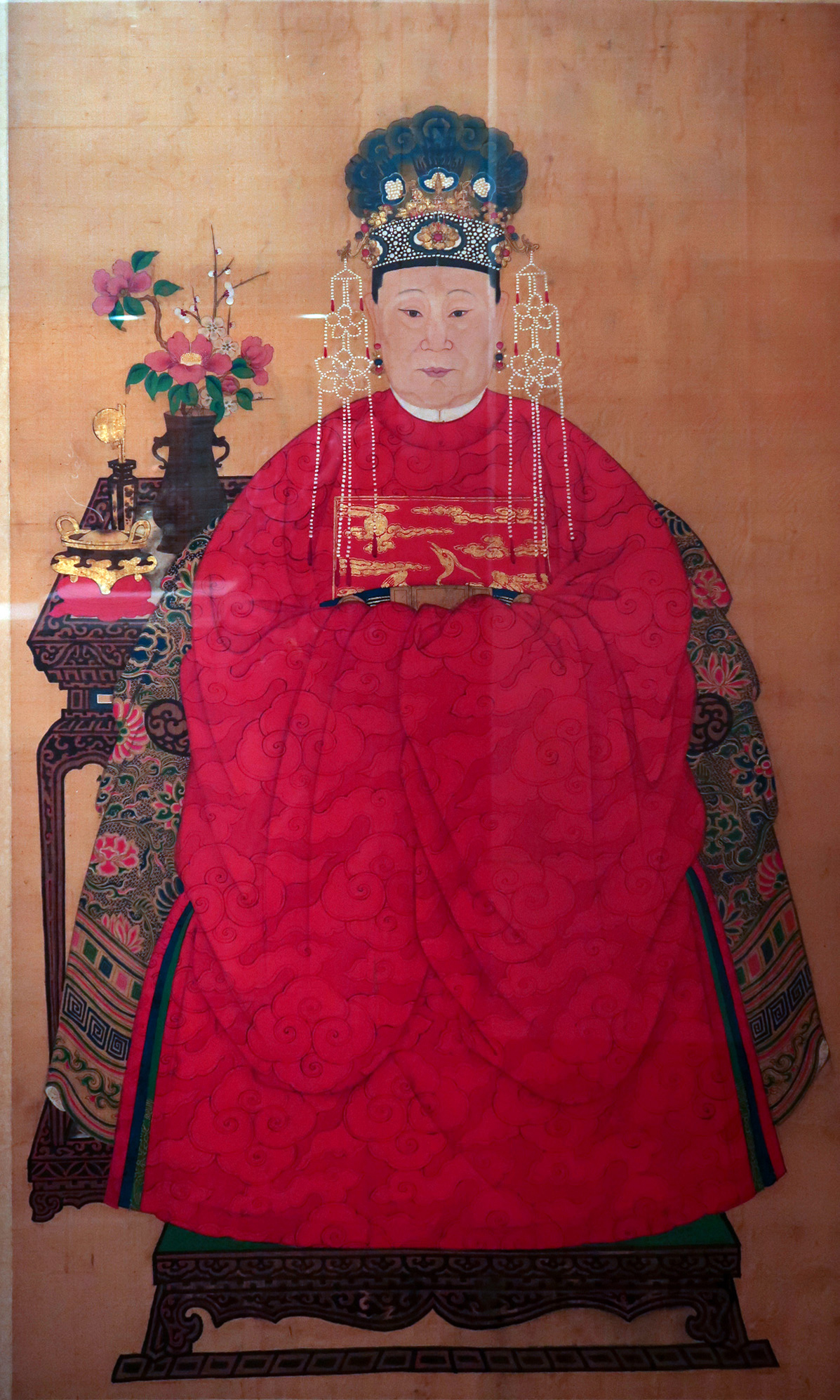
Yuanlingpao with broad sleeves, Ming dynasty

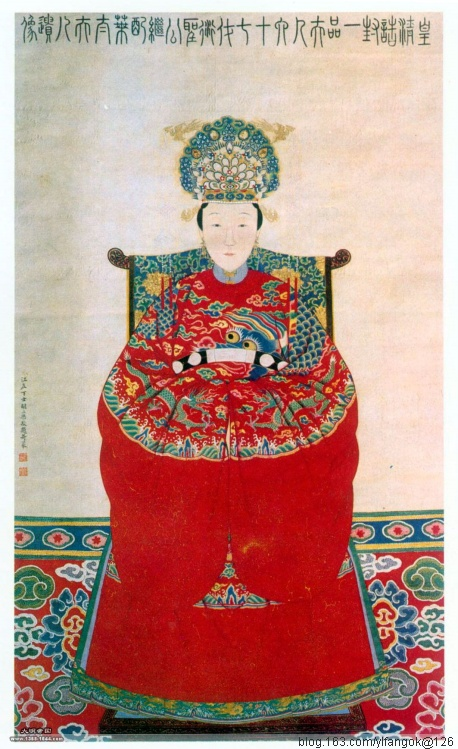
Yuanlingpao, Qing dynasty

==== Tang Dynasty (618–907) ====
The Tang dynasty marks the full institutionalization of the circle collar robe as formal court attire. The yuanlingpao was adopted as a standard garment for officials, nobles, and even emperors. Typically featuring a round neckline, straight central opening, tight-fitting sleeves, and a belted waist, Tang-era circle collar robes often displayed vibrant colors and ornate embroidery. Distinctions in rank were reflected in color, decorative borders, and accompanying headgear, such as the futou (幞頭). The robe's elegant design and cosmopolitan aesthetic helped export it across East Asia, influencing court dress in Korea, Japan, and Vietnam.

==== Song Dynasty (960–1279) ====
In the Song dynasty, the circle collar robe retained its importance but underwent stylistic refinement. Compared to the more flamboyant Tang version, the Song yuanlingpao was characterized by subdued colors, looser silhouettes, and wider sleeves, reflecting the Confucian values of modesty and scholarly restraint that dominated elite culture. It remained a common garment among officials, scholars, and members of the gentry, often worn in layered ensembles that included vests or outer coats. The Song version of the robe emphasized literati aesthetics over martial or imperial grandeur.

==== Yuan Dynasty (1271–1368) ====
Under the Mongol-led Yuan dynasty, Han Chinese clothing styles such as the yuanlingpao continued in use, particularly among Han officials and the general population, although they were no longer the primary court style. The Mongol aristocracy favored their own steppe-inspired garments, which differed in cut and construction. Nevertheless, the circle collar robe remained prevalent in Han Chinese ritual contexts and was allowed within the framework of Yuan multicultural governance. Its use during this period underscores its resilience as a marker of Han identity.

==== Ming Dynasty (1368–1644) ====
The Ming dynasty saw the revival and formal codification of Han Chinese dress traditions, with the circle collar robe emerging as the dominant form of official attire. The Ming yuanlingpao featured a multi-paneled structure (jishen 繼身), precise tailoring, and elaborate ornamentation. Officials wore robes with rank badges (buzi 補子), and emperors donned specially embroidered variants with imperial motifs such as dragons and auspicious clouds. The robe was paired with a futou headcloth and a belt, and was strictly regulated by sumptuary laws. The Ming version of the circle collar robe came to symbolize Confucian state order, Han cultural continuity, and imperial authority.

==== Qing Dynasty (1644–1912) ====
Following the Manchu conquest, the Qing dynasty replaced Han Chinese court attire with Manchu-style robes such as the chaofu, mangpao, and changfu, all characterized by horse-hoof cuffs and narrower cuts. The yuanlingpao was officially abolished from court usage. However, it survived in limited contexts: Han Chinese scholars and ritualists continued to wear Ming-style circle collar robes for Confucian ceremonies and ancestral rites, and the robe remained prominent in traditional theater, particularly in Peking opera, where it was used to represent historical figures from earlier dynasties. In this period, the robe took on a symbolic role as a vestige of Han tradition and, for some, a quiet form of cultural resistance.

=== Korea ===
In Korea, round collared hanbok was worn with roots in hobok and Goguryeo murals show that it was worn often as an inner garment. The official court uniform called danryeong was introduced from Tang dynasty by Kim Chun-chu in the second year of Queen Jindeok's rule. Since then, it has been worn as an official outfit for government officials until the end of Joseon. It originated from the Chinese' round collar robe. At first, the danryeong collar was circular, similar to the Chinese round collar robe but later localized into a uniquely Korean U-shaped collar also seen in the Won-sam.

Danryeong is used as a type of Gwanbok. Sometimes it is worn together with the dapho.

In late Joseon, under the 1884 decree of King Gojong, only black-coloured danryeong were permitted to be worn by court officials.

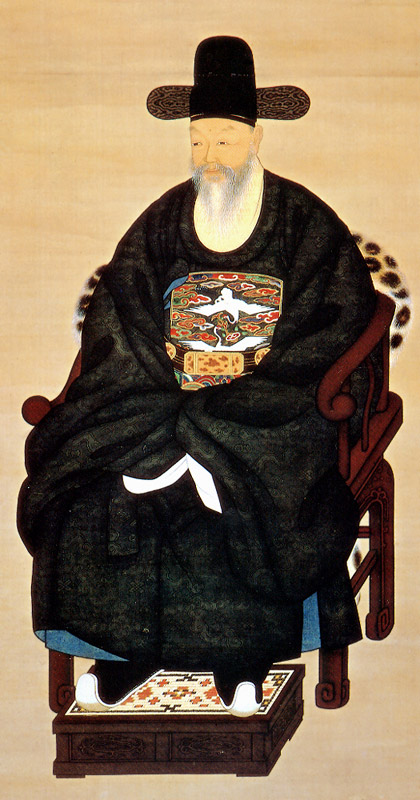
Danryeong of Joseon Dynasty

==== Goryeo Kingdom ====
The circle collar robe, known in Chinese as 圓領袍 (yuánlǐng páo), was first introduced to Korea during the Unified Silla period, but became more widespread and standardized during the Goryeo dynasty, likely due to close diplomatic and cultural ties with Tang and Song China. The circle collar robe was originally a form of court or official attire in China, particularly among scholar-officials and bureaucrats.

In Korea during the Goryeo period, this robe was known as the "wonryeongpo" (원령포, 圓領袍)—a direct transliteration of the Chinese name. It featured a round collar, side slits, and narrow sleeves, and was used by both military and civil officials.

Goryeo kings and officials frequently adopted Tang- and Song-style robes, both due to admiration for Chinese culture and the tributary relationship that encouraged the emulation of Chinese court fashion. The wonryeongpo was often worn under more decorative outer garments.

==== Joseon ====
When Joseon replaced Goryeo, the new dynasty initiated a Neo-Confucian cultural reform. Chinese Ming dynasty clothing became the dominant model, and the wonryeongpo remained in use—but underwent some stylistic changes.

In the early Joseon period, the wonryeongpo was part of the official court dress (gwanbok, 관복/官服), especially among military officials. By the end of the Joseon dynasty (danryeong,단령/團領)had replaced wonryeongpo as the standard term.

In modern South Korea, danryeong are still worn on some occasions such as traditional Korean weddings and historical reenactments.

=== Vietnam ===
==== Lý (1009–1225) and Trần (1225–1400) Dynasties ====
These dynasties saw increasing Sinicization in government and dress.

The round-collar robe became a prominent part of official and imperial court attire, largely based on Tang-Song fashion.

Vietnamese records and statues (such as those at the Temple of Literature) depict officials in 圆领袍 (viên lĩnh bào)—a long-sleeved, round-collared robe, often belted, following Tang/Song patterns.

==== Lê Dynasty (1428–1789) ====
After the Ming occupation of Vietnam (1407–1427), the restored Lê dynasty implemented wide-ranging Confucian reforms, including adoption of Ming-style bureaucracy and clothing.

Vietnamese imperial robes from the Later Lê dynasty closely followed Ming court fashion, including the circle collar robe (viên lĩnh/圓領).

Officials wore phục trang cát phục (court uniforms) with round collars and rank badges, clearly modeled on Ming Chinese patterns.

==== Nguyễn Dynasty (1802–1945) ====
The Nguyễn emperors, particularly Gia Long, sought Qing recognition and mimicked Qing court styles.

This marked a distinct break from earlier Chinese traditions: Ming-style wide robes and circle collars were replaced by narrow-sleeved robes, horse-hoof cuffs, and mandarin jackets inspired by Manchu dress.

The Vietnamese áo mãng and áo nhật bình, formal Nguyễn court garments, were heavily influenced by Manchu Qing attire.

Despite this shift, older styles like viên lĩnh robes were still worn ceremonially, especially by scholars or in conservative regions.

=== Ryukyu Kingdom ===
==== Sho Dynasty ====
After the Ryukyu Kingdom unified under King Shō Hashi in 1429, it entered a tributary relationship with Ming China. In return, Ming emperors recognized Ryukyuan kings and provided them with investiture robes and regalia.

These investiture ceremonies were highly formal and always included the bestowal of Ming-style round-collared robes (圓領袍), headwear, and official seals.

In Chinese, the robe was called 圓領袍 (yuánlǐng páo); in Ryukyuan records (which used Classical Chinese), the same term appears, sometimes pronounced enryōhō or rendered in Japanese as danrin (団領), like in Korea.

These robes were worn at court for ceremonial occasions and by Ryukyuan envoys traveling to China.

==== Japanese Rule (17th century to today) ====
After the Satsuma Domain invaded Ryukyu in 1609, the kingdom came under dual subordination: it continued to send tribute missions to Qing China while being under indirect Japanese control.

The Ryukyuan court continued to wear Ming-style circle collar robes while also wearing Qing-style mangpao-like garments, provided by the Qing court for official missions.

However, under Satsuma influence, Japanese-style court garments (such as hitatare or kariginu-style robes) began appearing in more domestic political contexts.

Still, the Ming-style circle collar robe remained the highest ceremonial attire, especially in relations with Qing China and still remains symbolic of the Ryukyu Kingdom today.

=== Japan ===
Unlike court robes in other parts of the Sinosphere, the Japanese 袍, more commonly known as the Sokutai, is a specific type of formal court dress that has remained largely unchanged since its introduction under Tang dynasty influence. Aside from adopting a looser fit starting in the early Heian period, the Sokutai has not undergone major modifications.

== See also ==
- China: Yuanlingshan; Panling Lanshan, fanlingpao
- Korea: Gwanbok
- Japan: Sokutai
