= Traditional Chinese wedding dress =

Traditional Han Chinese wedding attire

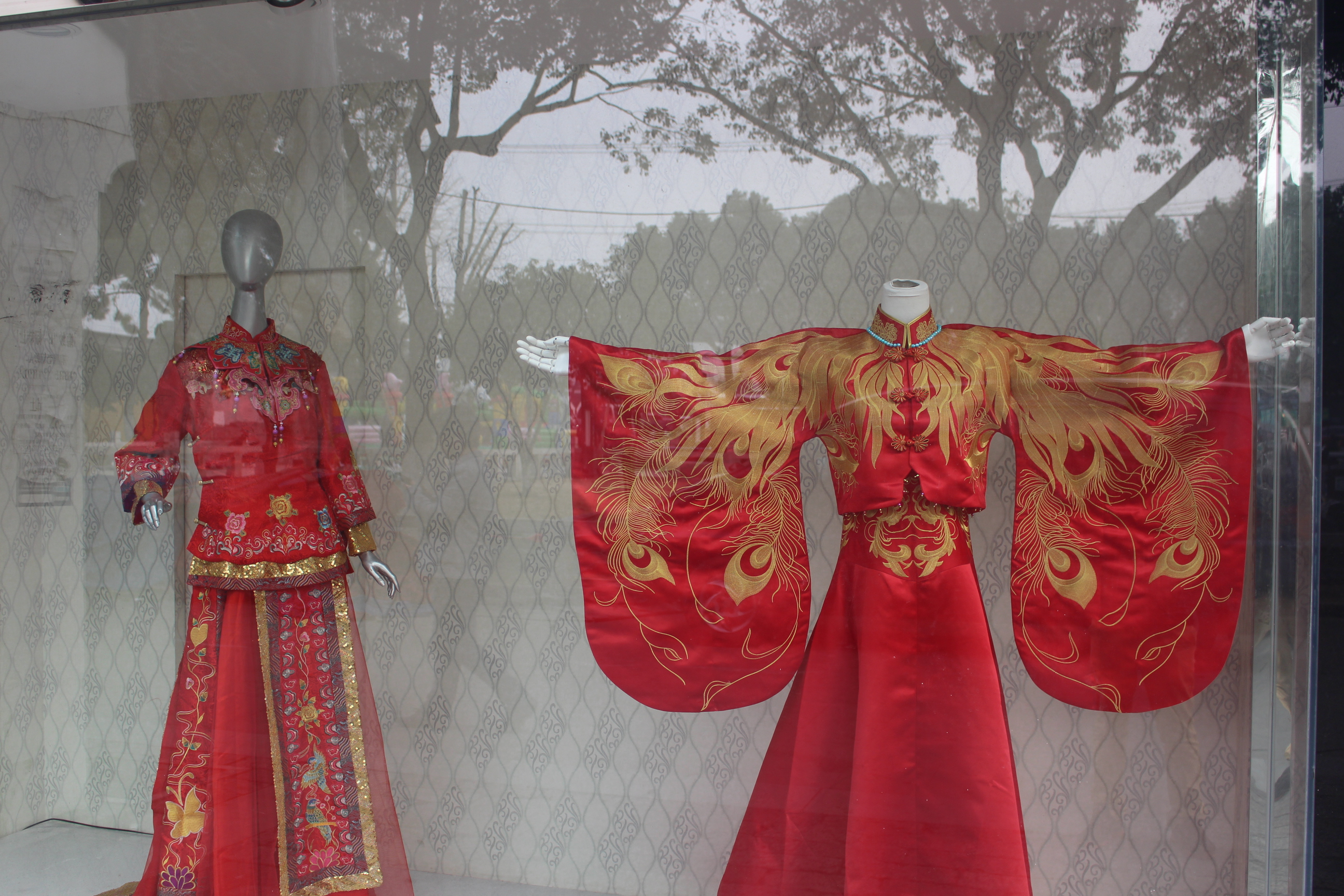
Example of traditional Chinese-style wedding dress

Traditional Chinese wedding dress is a collective term which refers to all the different forms and styles of traditional wedding attire worn by the Han Chinese when performing their marriage ceremony, including the traditional Chinese marriage. There are various forms of traditional Chinese wedding dress in the history of China. Since the Zhou dynasty, there have national laws and rules which regulated the different categories of clothing and personal accessories; these regulations have created various categories of clothing attire, including the traditional wedding attire of the Chinese people.

== Types of attire ==
=== Attire for brides ===
==== Cheongsam ====
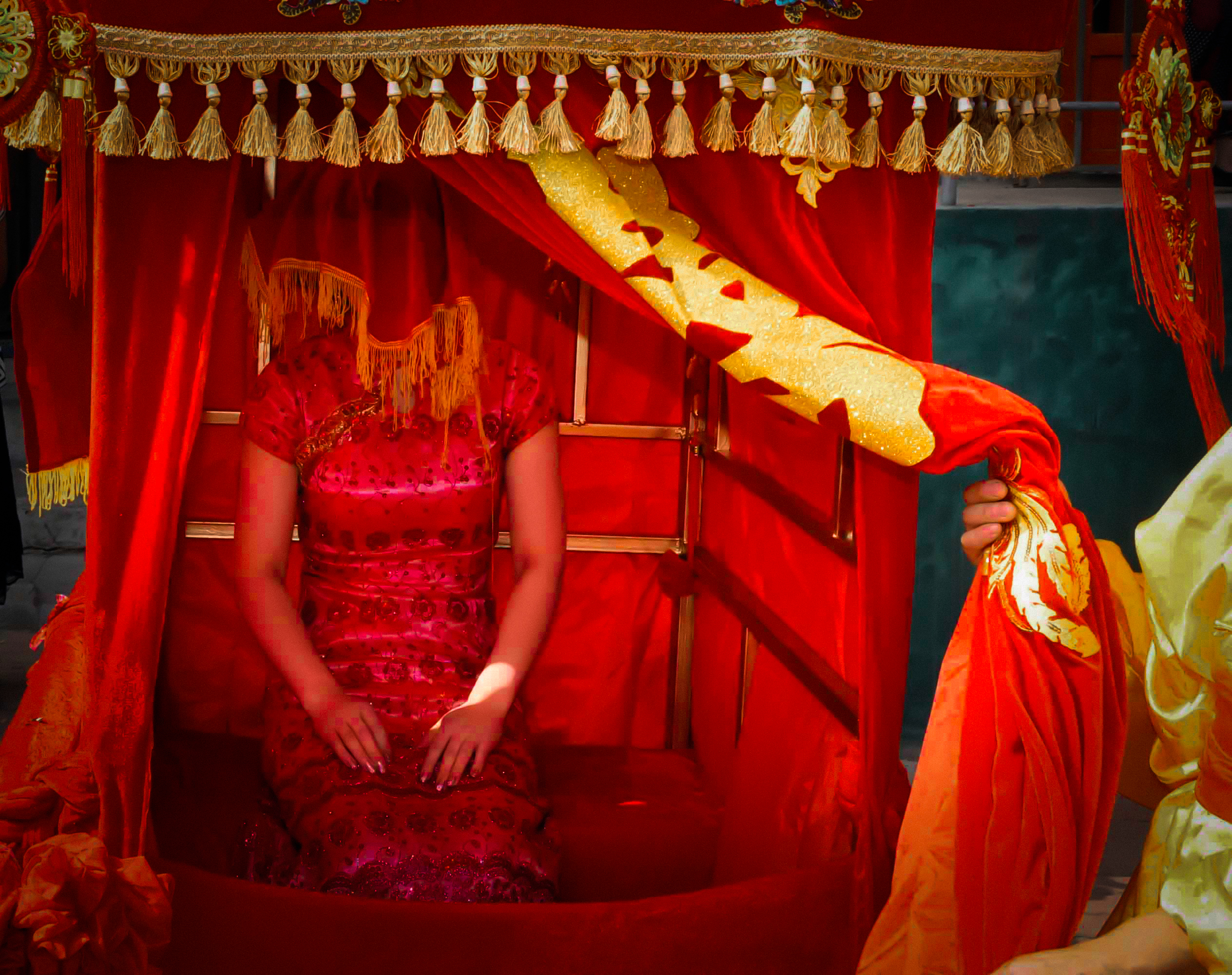
Chinese bride wearing cheongsam with a honggaitou covering her face for wedding ceremony.

The cheongsam (Chinese: 旗袍), or zansae also known as qipao, sometimes referred to as the mandarin gown, traces its origins to the Qing dynasty. Cheongsam was the dress for Manchu women which become popular in Hong Kong and Shanghai after the fall of the Qing dynasty in 1912. Nowadays, the cheongsam can also be worn as a wedding dress.

==== Fengguan xiapei ====
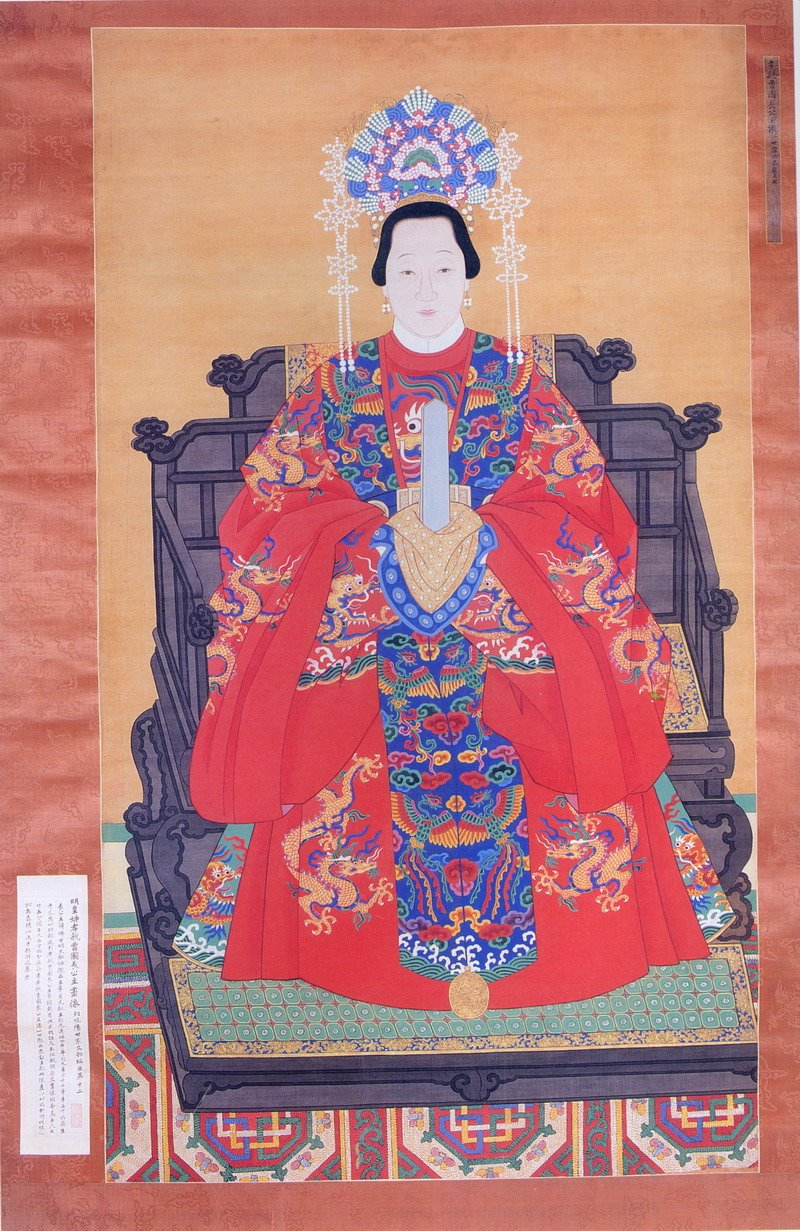
Ming dynasty noblewomen wearing a blue embroidered xiapei over her red robe

The fengguan xiapei (Chinese: 凤冠霞帔) is a type of wedding set of attire categorized under Hanfu. It was worn in Ming and Qing dynasties. The fengguan xiapei attire was composed an upper and lower garment following the traditional yichang system.

In the Qing dynasty, it was composed of an ao, a type of upper garment, called mangao (Chinese: 蟒袄; lit. 'python jacket') and a qun, lower skirt, called mangchu (lit. 'python skirt').

The mangao was a type of yuanlingshan fashioned in the style of the Ming dynasty which was red in colour; it used to be worn by the Han Chinese women as a court robe.

The mangchu was a qun which could either be red or green in colour; it was embroidered with dragons and phoenixes on the front and back lapel of the skirt. The two accessory items from which the set of attire gained its name was the fengguan, which was a type of guan (a type of Chinese traditional headgear), and the xiapei (Chinese: 霞帔).

The appearance of the xiapei appearance and construction differed depending on the time period: in the Ming dynasty, the xiapei was similar to a long scarf or stole in appearance; however, it became a type of waistcoat in the Qing dynasty. The fengguan xiapei was sometimes adorned with the yunjian. Following the wedding ceremony, married women were expected to wear the fengguan xiapei on formal occasions, however, Chinese trousers or leggings were worn beneath instead of the skirt.

==== Qungua ====
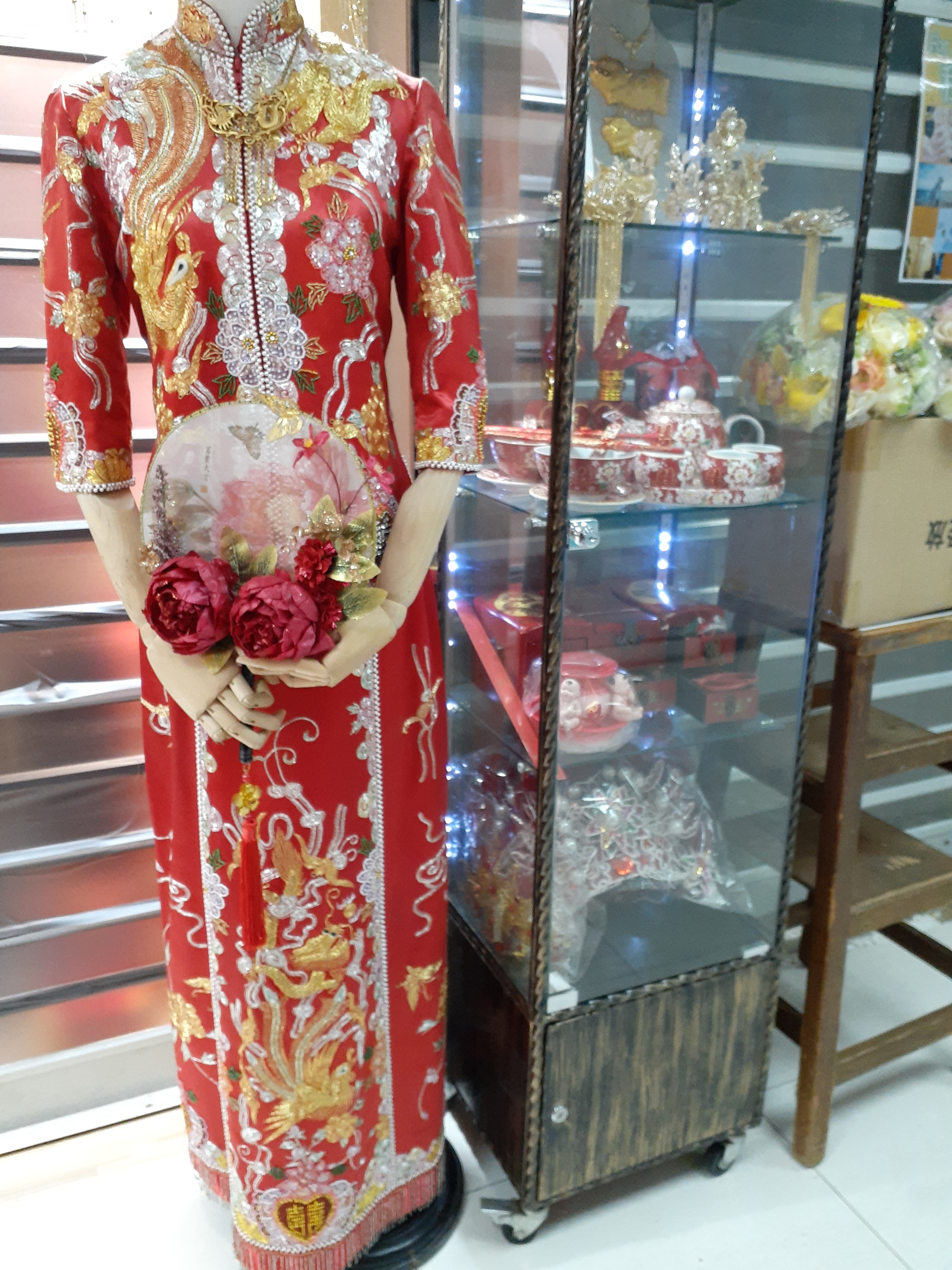
A qungua, 2020

The qungua, also commonly known as longfenggua, guaqun or longfeng qungua is a set of attire which follows the traditional yichang system. It is a composed of a jacket called gua (Chinese:褂) and a long qun (Chinese:裙) which could be straight in cut or have pleated sides.

The tradition of wearing the qungua as a wedding dress originated in the Qing dynasty during the 18th century. Initially, the qungua was sewn by the mother of the bride as soon as the bride was born due to the time-consuming process of the handcraft; it would then be given later on as the part of the bride's dowry from her family when she would get married. There are 5 different types of qungua (Guahuang, Guahou, Dawufu, Zhongwufu, Xiaowufu) which are based on the amount of embroideries which were crafted on the dress. Nowadays, the qungua has been commercialized and remains a popular form of wedding dress.

==== Xiuhefu ====
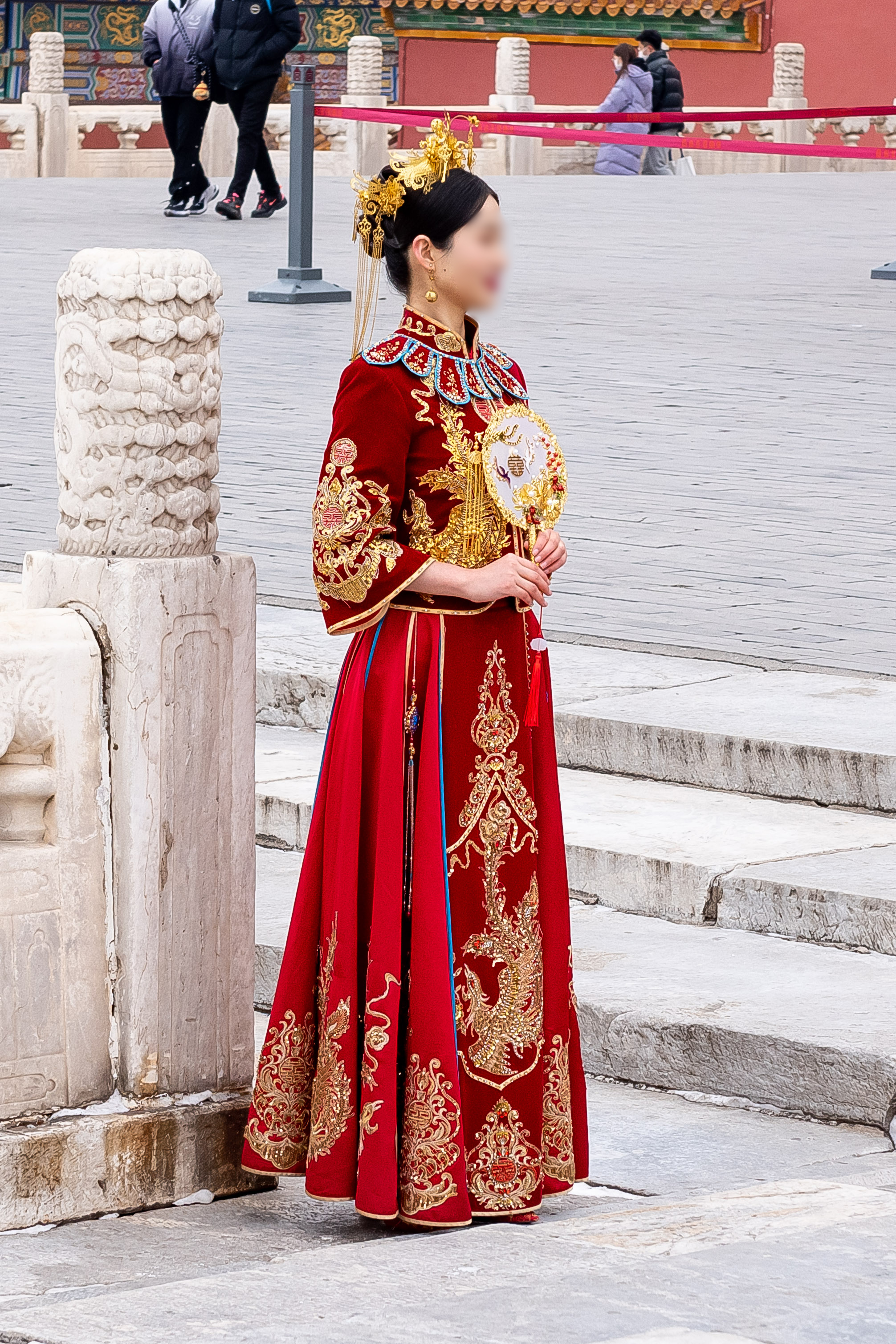
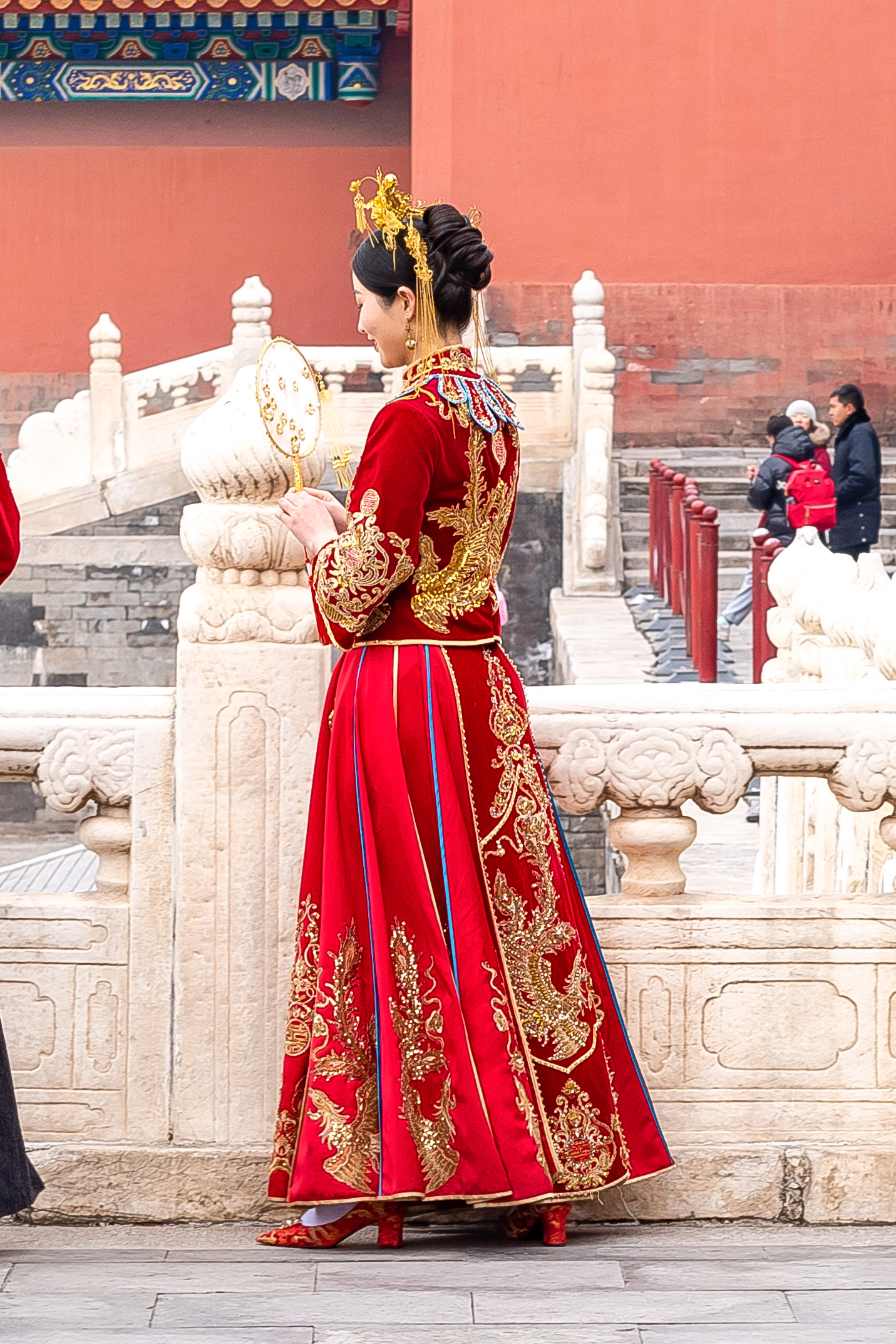
Xiuhefu (front and backview)

The Xiuhefu (simplified Chinese: 秀禾服; traditional Chinese: 繡和服) is a set of attire which follows the traditional yichang system; it is a composed of a waist-length liling dajin ao and a long A-line qun, which looks similar to a mamianqun. The Xiuhefu is typically embroidered with flowers and birds to symbolize love for whole seasons.

The precursor of the Xiuhefu can be traced back to the Qing dynasty where a Qing dynasty-style aoqun, consisted of liling dajin changao and a mamianqun, was worn as a form of wedding dress during this period. What is currently known as the Xiuhefu became popular in 2001 when Zhou Xun, the actress who played the role of Xiu He, wore a modern recreation version of the Qing dynasty wedding aoqun in the Chinese television drama Orange turned red (Chinese: 橘子紅了) thus gaining its contemporary name from name of the character, Xiu He.

== Gallery ==
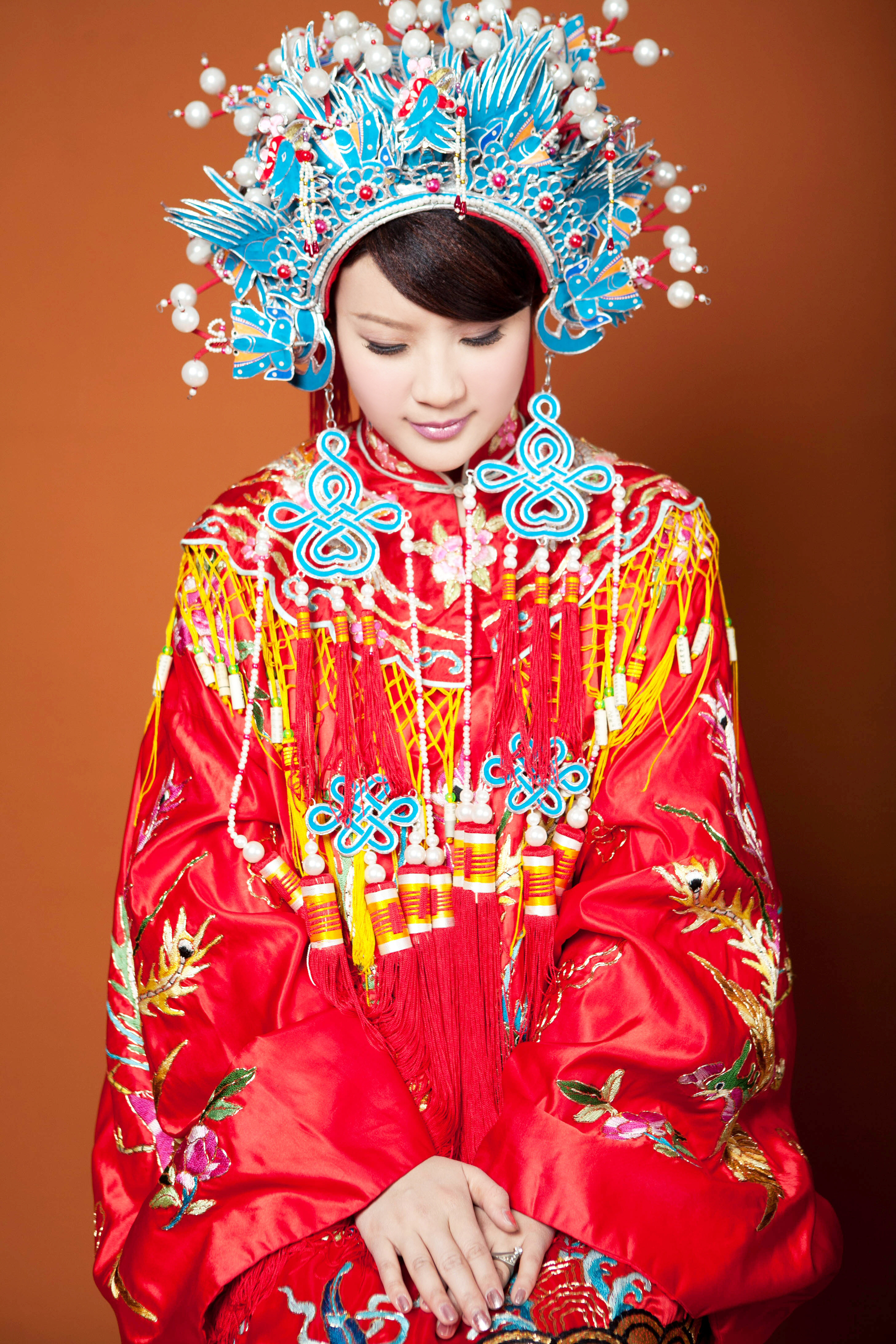
Fengguan (also known as phoenix coronet)

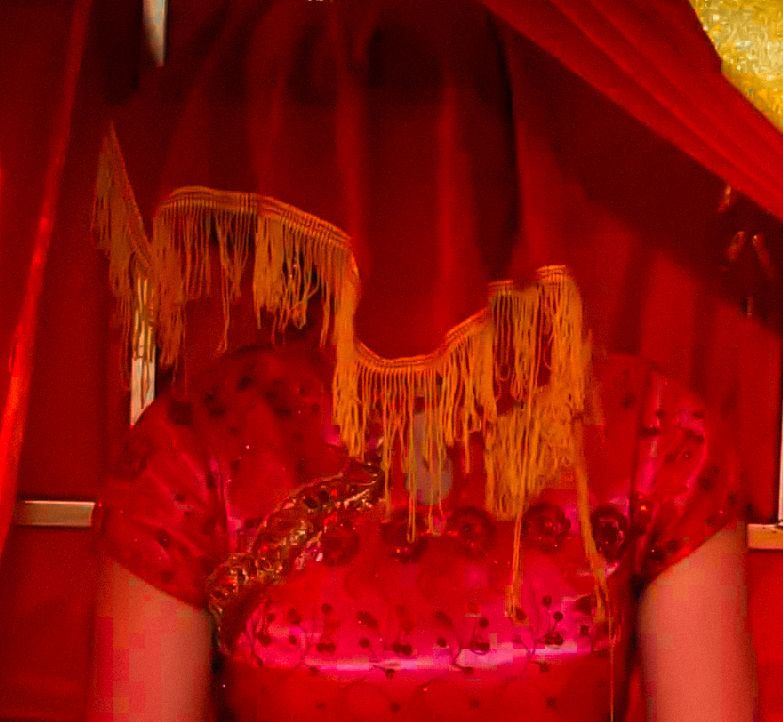
Honggaitou

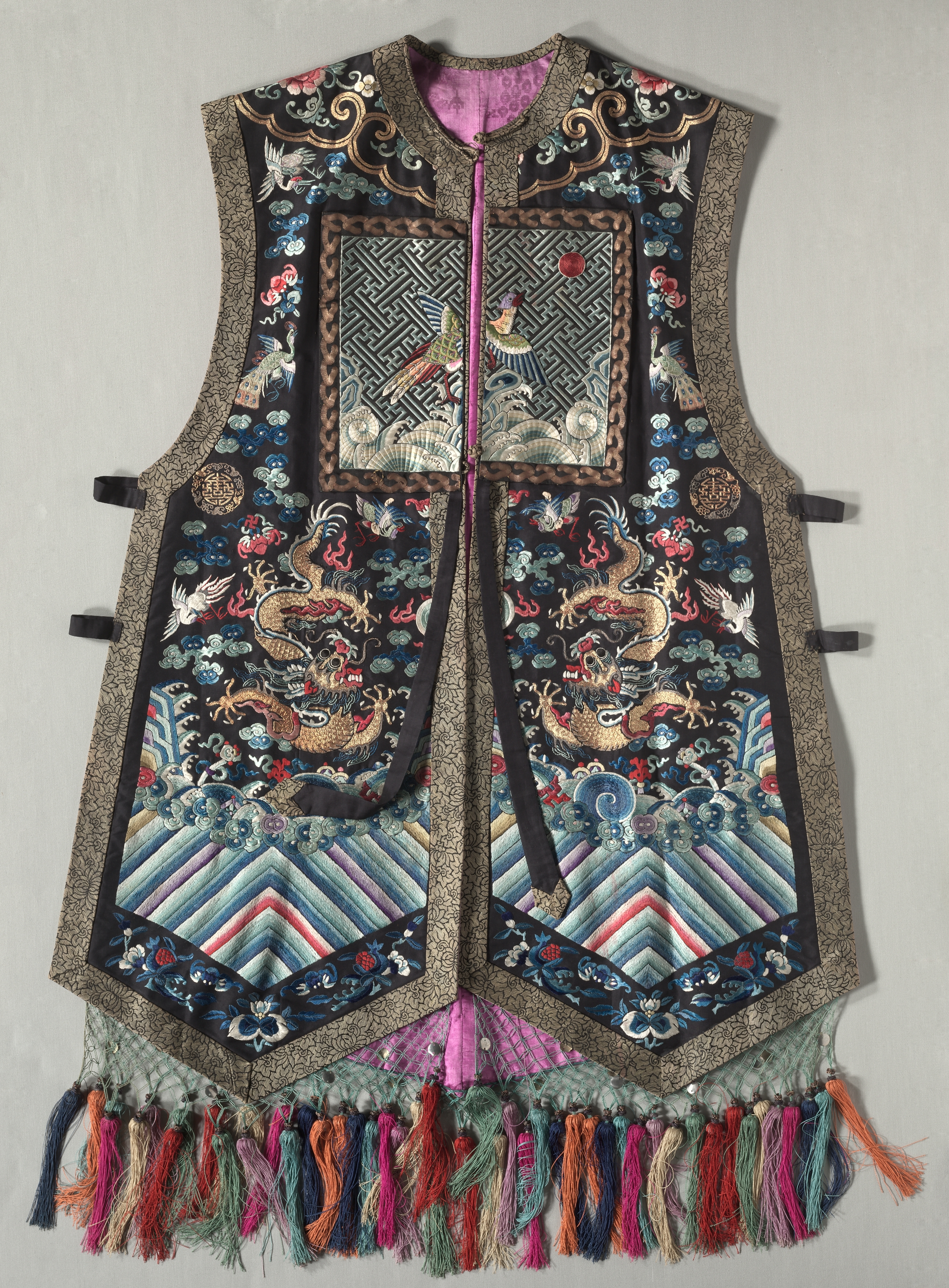
Xiapei

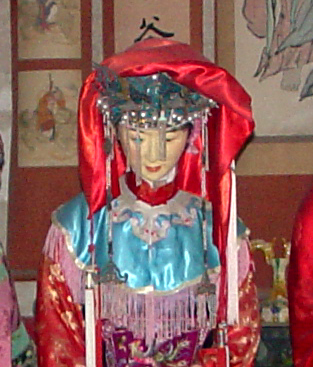
Yunjian

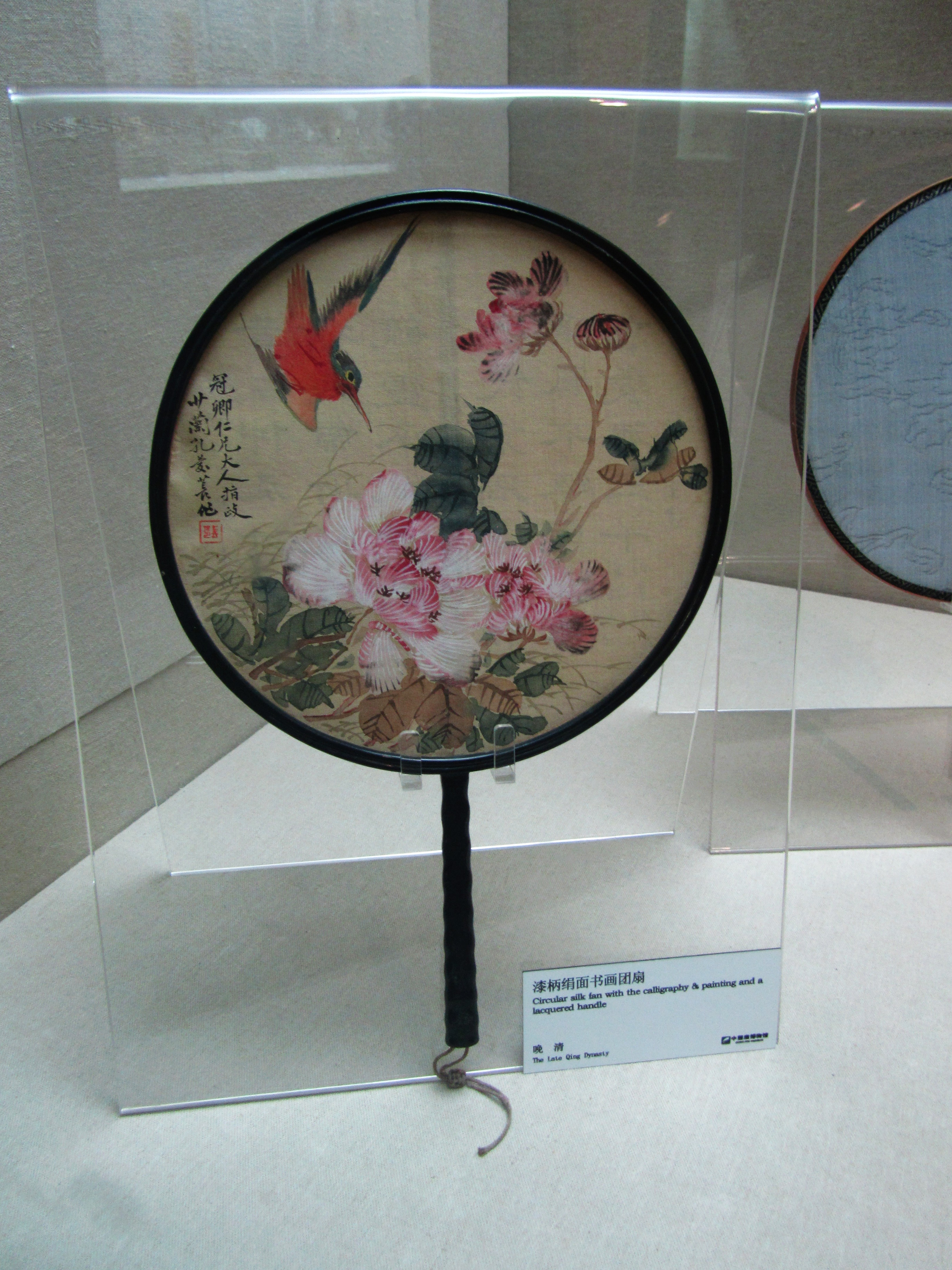
Tuanshan

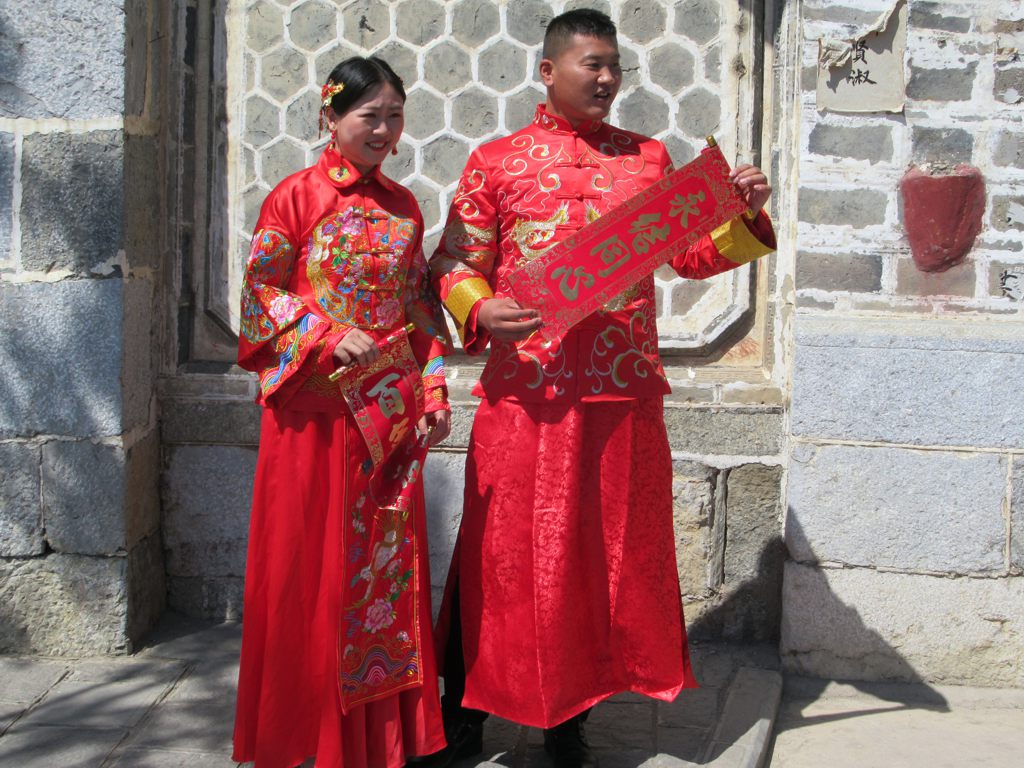
Wedding picture at Xizhou, Yunnan, China

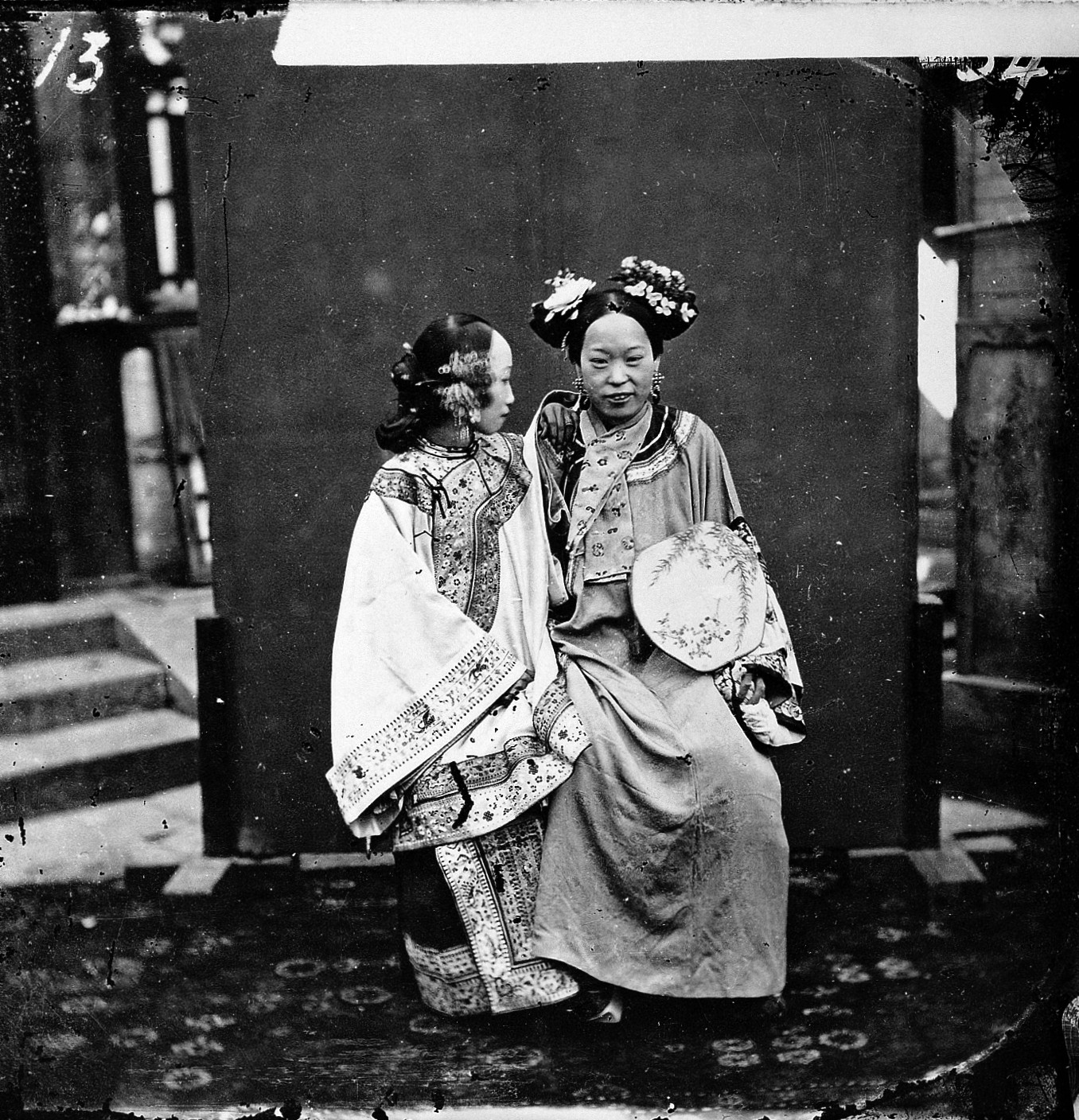
Manchu bride in her wedding clothes, c. 1871

== See also ==
- Hanfu
- Ruqun
