= Xiuhefu =

Chinese traditional wedding dress-style garment

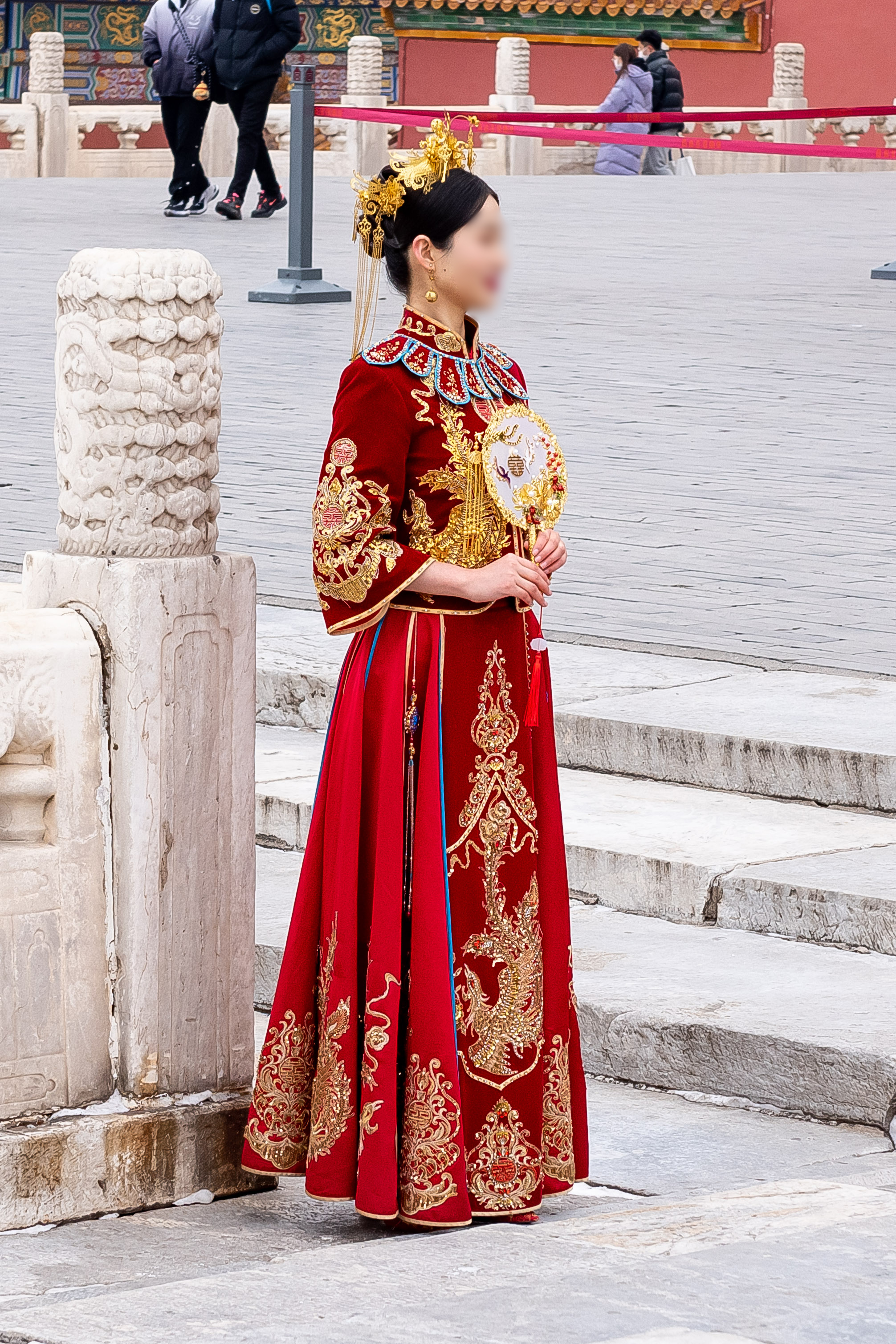
- Type: Traditional Chinese wedding dress in aoqun fashion
- Place of origin: China

Xiuhefu
- Chinese: 秀禾服
Transcriptions
Standard Mandarin
- Hanyu Pinyin: Xiùhéfú
- Wade–Giles: Hsiu4-ho2-fu2
Yue: Cantonese
- Jyutping: sau3 wo4 fuk6

Xiuhefu (Chinese: 秀禾服; pinyin: xiùhé fú; lit. 'Xiuhe garment') is a modern style of Chinese bridal attire. It consists of a two-piece garment ensemble designed to resemble traditional Chinese wedding attire while adhering to the traditional Chinese yichang clothing system. The Xiuhefu is a modern recreation of the Qing dynasty wedding aoqun, a form of Hanfu worn by Han Chinese women which composed of a qun as lower garment and an ao as an upper garment. It was developed in modern China and became popular in 2001 when it was popularized by Zhou Xun, the actress who played the role of Xiu He in the Chinese television drama Juzi Hongle (橘子紅了; 'Orange turned red'), thus gaining its contemporary name from name of the television drama character. It is often confused with another traditional Chinese wedding dress known as qungua due to their similarities in appearance.

== Origins ==
Precursors of the xiuhefu

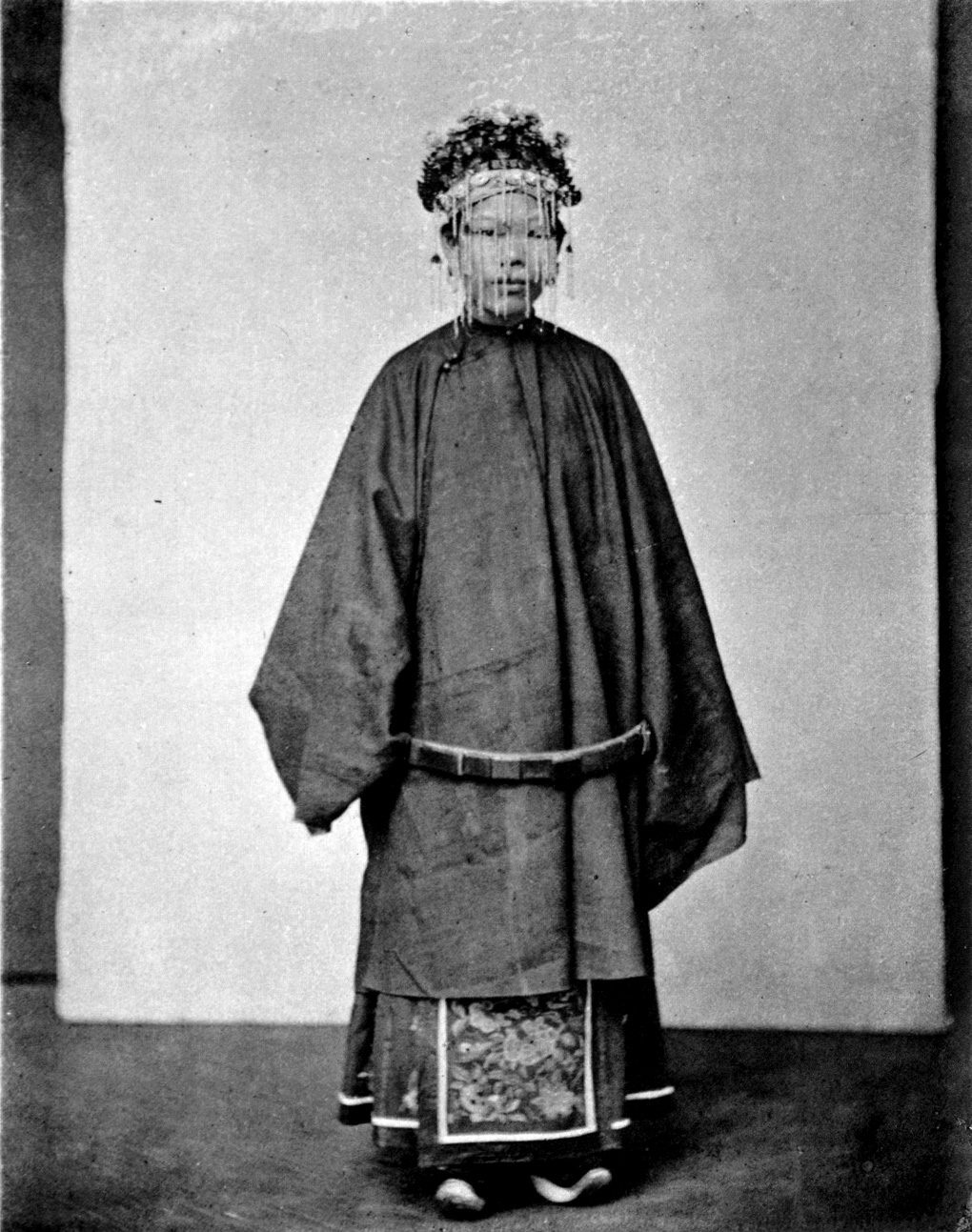
c. 19th century

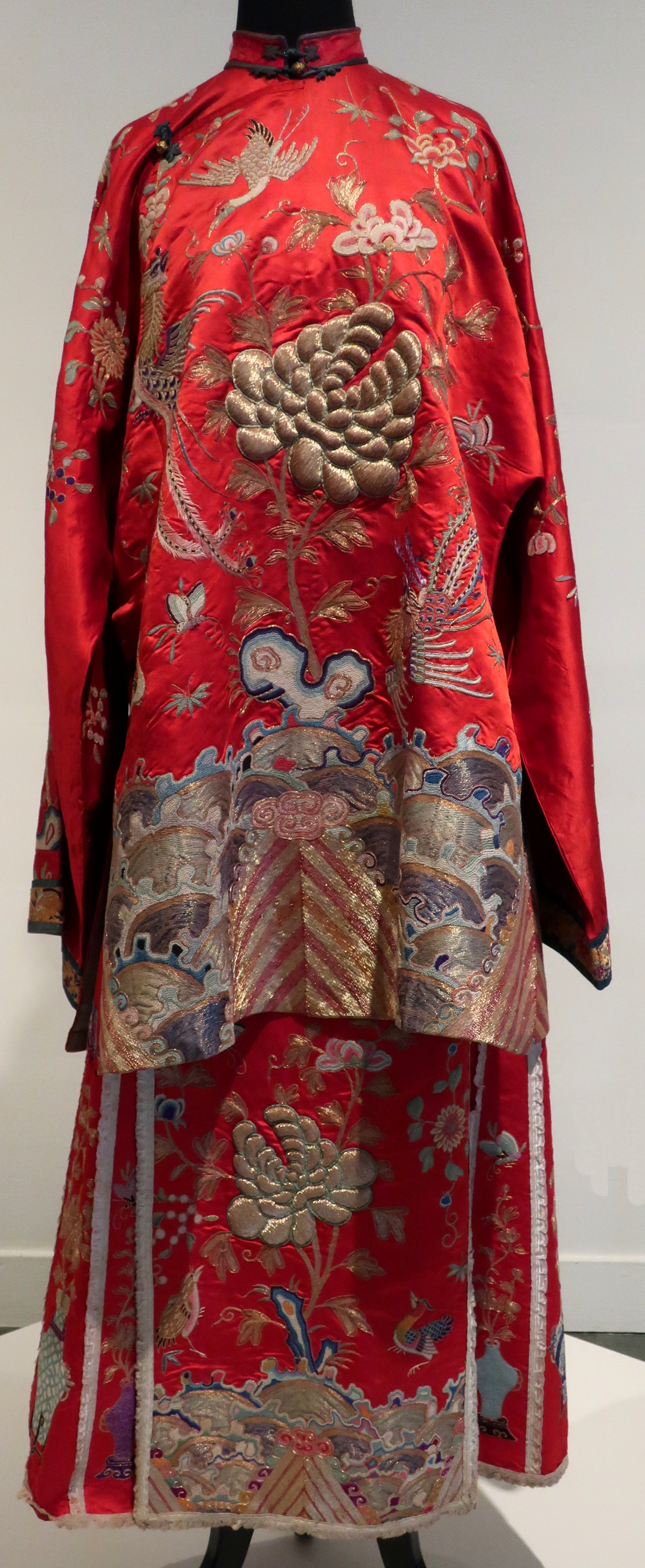
c. 1900

Wedding aoqun of the Qing dynasty

The direct precursor of the Xiuhefu originated from the Qing dynasty-style wedding aoqun worn by Han Chinese women. It consisted of a mamianqun (a specific type of qun) as lower garment and an liling dajin changao (a specific type of ao) as an upper garment.

In 2001, the prototype of the modern Xiuhefu was a guzhuang-style wedding dress costume designed by costume designer Ye Jintian for the character Xiu He, portrayed by Chinese actress Zhou Xun in the 2002 Chinese television drama Juzi Hongle (橘子紅了), known in English as Ripening Orange. The drama is set in the Republican era of China. The wedding costume worn by Xiu He thus became known as Xiuhefu. Although Ye Jintian based the costume on Qing dynasty clothing, he did not fully adhere to historical accuracy. Instead, he incorporated and combined elements from several closely related eras in his costume design.

Owing to its perceived dignity and beauty, the Xiuhefu designed by Ye Jintian became progressively popular and eventually became a widely chosen form of bridal attire. It was especially popular among several Chinese female celebrities.

== Construction and design ==
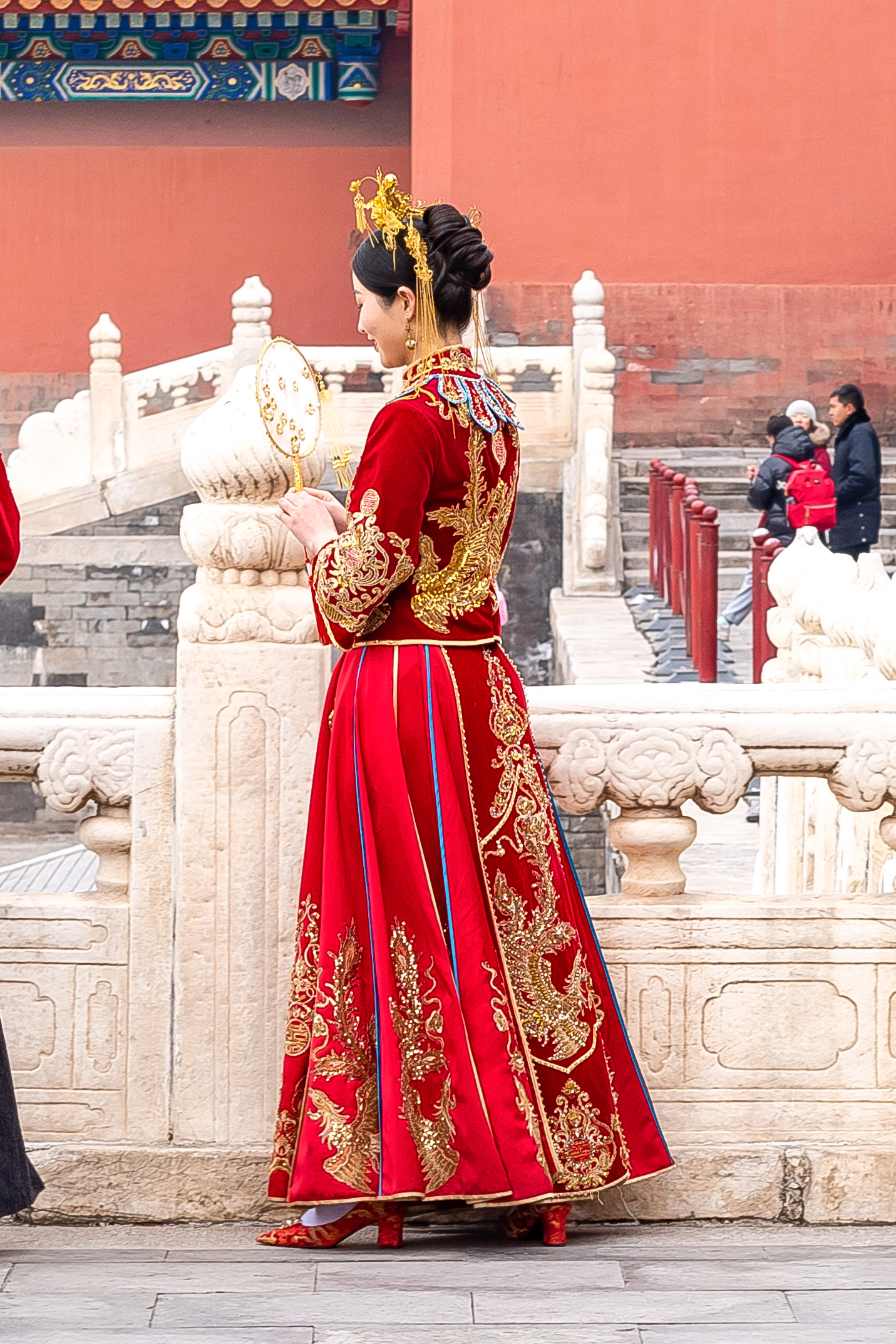
A bride in Xiuhefu near Xiehemen

In general, the design and construction of the Xiuhefu are not bound by traditional garment-making rules. However, as an ensemble, it follows the traditional yichang system and is typically composed of a waist-length liling dajin ao, a type of ao (two-layer jacket) characterized by an overlapping front closure crossing the chest and fastening on the right side with a liling (lit. 'standing collar'), and a long-length qun. The qun resembles a mamianqun, as it is considered one of its derivatives. The upper garment is not always a liling dajin ao; it may also be a yuanling ao, a type of ao with a round collar. The sleeves are typically horn-shaped and relatively wide and may sometimes be double-layered.

=== Mamianqun ===
The qun used in the Xiuhefu is influenced by a specific late-Qing style of the mamianqun, particularly the variants worn during the 1910s, when the skirt continued to form part of the bridal attire. This wedding skirt is also referred to as mamianqun. The mamianqun used in the Xiuhefu may take the form of either an A-line skirt, pleated skirt, or a pleated circle skirt. It features flat fabric panels embellished with decorative motifs executed using an embroidery technique known as Chaoxiu (Chinese: 潮繡; lit. 'Chao embroidery'). Unlike the historical mamianqun whose overlapping construction creates qunmen (裙門; 'skirt door') or mamian (馬面裙; 'horse face'), the flat, straight panels used in the Xiuhefu are attached to the exterior of the pleated skirt in a pendulum-like manner. The skirt may also feature more than two visible flat panels. The skirt is long enough to reach the tops of the wearer's feet.

=== Embroidery ===
The Xiuhefu is typically embroidered with floral motifs (e.g. peonies) and birds (e.g. peacocks), which symbolize enduring love throughout whole seasons. It may also be embroidered with pairs of butterflies and auspicious Chinese characters.

== Related content ==
- Hanfu
- Ruqun
- Mamianqun
- Guzhuang

== See also ==
- Traditional Chinese wedding dress
- Traditional Chinese marriage
- Qungua

== Gallery ==
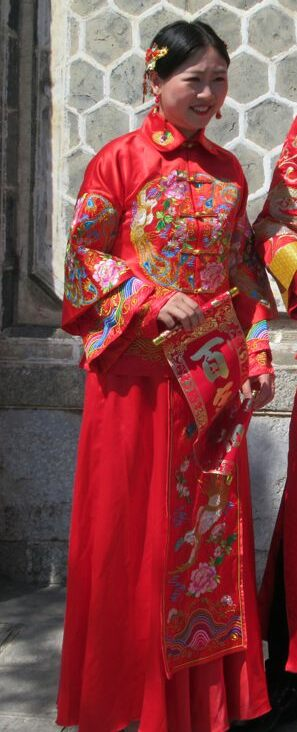

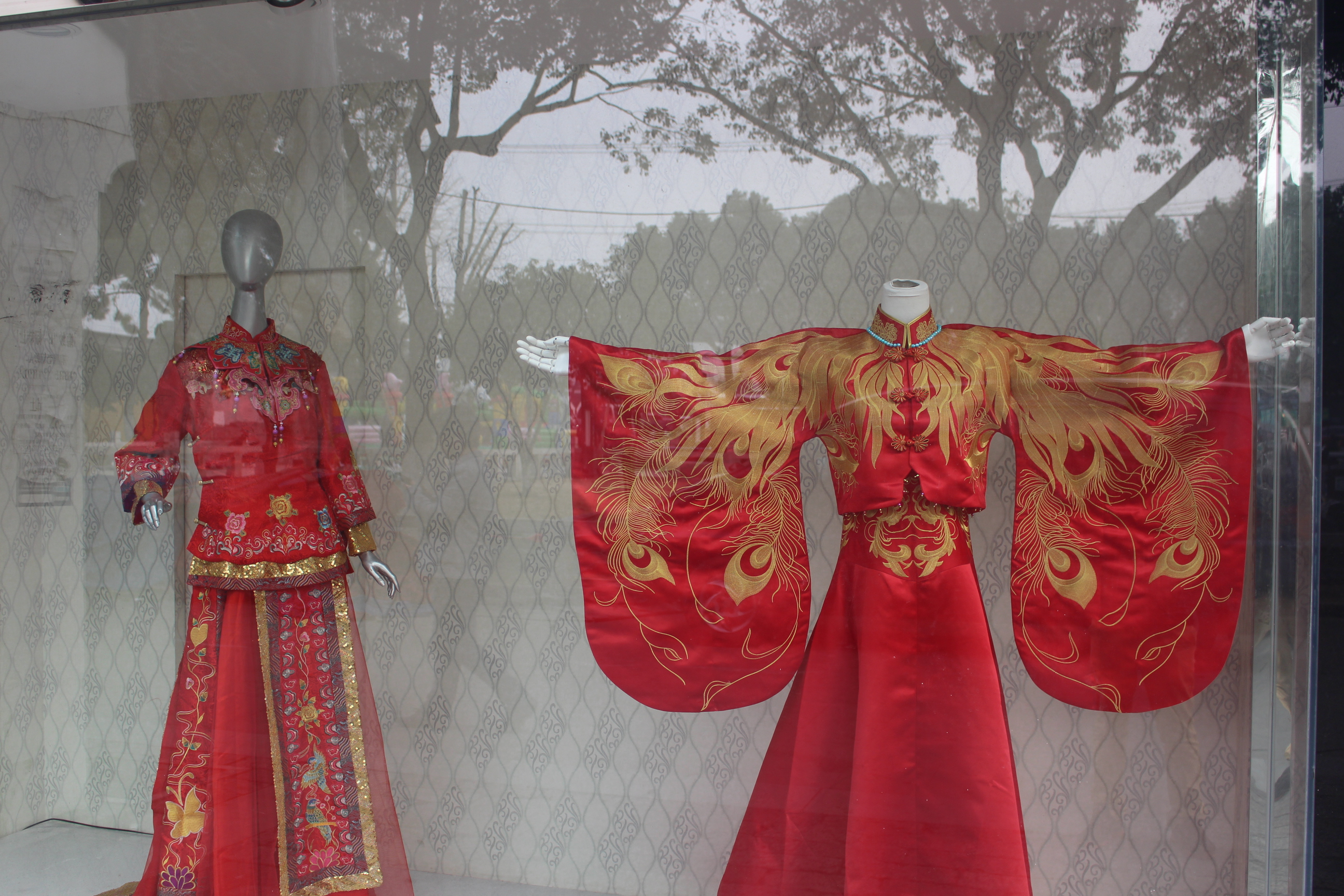
