= Baidiequn =

One-piece wrap-around Chinese skirt

- Chinese: 百迭裙
Transcriptions
Standard Mandarin
- Hanyu Pinyin: Bǎidiéqún

Baidiequn (Chinese: 百迭裙), also known as Hundred-change skirt, refers to a historical style of qun (Chinese: 裙; lit. 'skirt') worn by Han Chinese women in imperial China and is currently worn as a lower garment item in Hanfu. The baidiequn is typically a long, wrap-around densely pleated skirt with two flat surfaces at each end of the skirt. It has been worn at least since the Song dynasty, where unearthed artifacts of what is now referred as baidiequn were found in the Tomb of Huang Sheng (黄升墓) of the Southern Song dynasty, Fuzhou, Fujian Province. It is also one of the two early Song dynasty prototypes of the mamianqun.

== Construction and design ==
The baidiequn is made of a single panel of fabric. Its pleats tend to be very narrow and/or dense and almost covers the entire circumference of the skirt, except for the two edges of the skirts which are left non-pleated. Due to the non-pleated edges of the skirt, the skirt form two rectangular flat panels, which are referred as guangmian (光面); when worn, the two guangmian of the baidiequn overlaps each other appearing to be a single flat panel. It has a wide waist band and long ribbons which are used as ties.

=== Modern variation ===
The modern variation of the baidiequn features narrow pleats, which are about one to two centimetres in term of pleat width. There is typically no rule on where the guangmian need to be located on its wearer's body, as such the guangmian can be found at the sides, back, or front depending on its wearer's desire.

The length of the baidiequn can also vary depending if it worn alone or is combined with other garments: the classic baidiequn is a long-length skirt which is about ankle or floor-length and can be worn as a stand-alone lower garment; it also the most commonly seen variation of the baidiequn; the hewei baidiequn (合圍 百迭裙), also called encircling baidiequn, usually reaches the mid-calf and is used as an over-skirt which can be worn over another qun or ku; the last type is the qianduan houzhuang (前短 後長), which has a shorter guangmian compared to its pleated regions are floor-length; due to its special construction, the qianduan houzhuang is the only form of baidiequn which requires having its guangmian located at the front of the body.

== Related content ==
- Mamianqun
- Qun
- Ruqun
- Yaoqun

== See also ==
- Hanfu
- List of Hanfu
- Kilt
