= Qun =

Traditional Chinese skirts

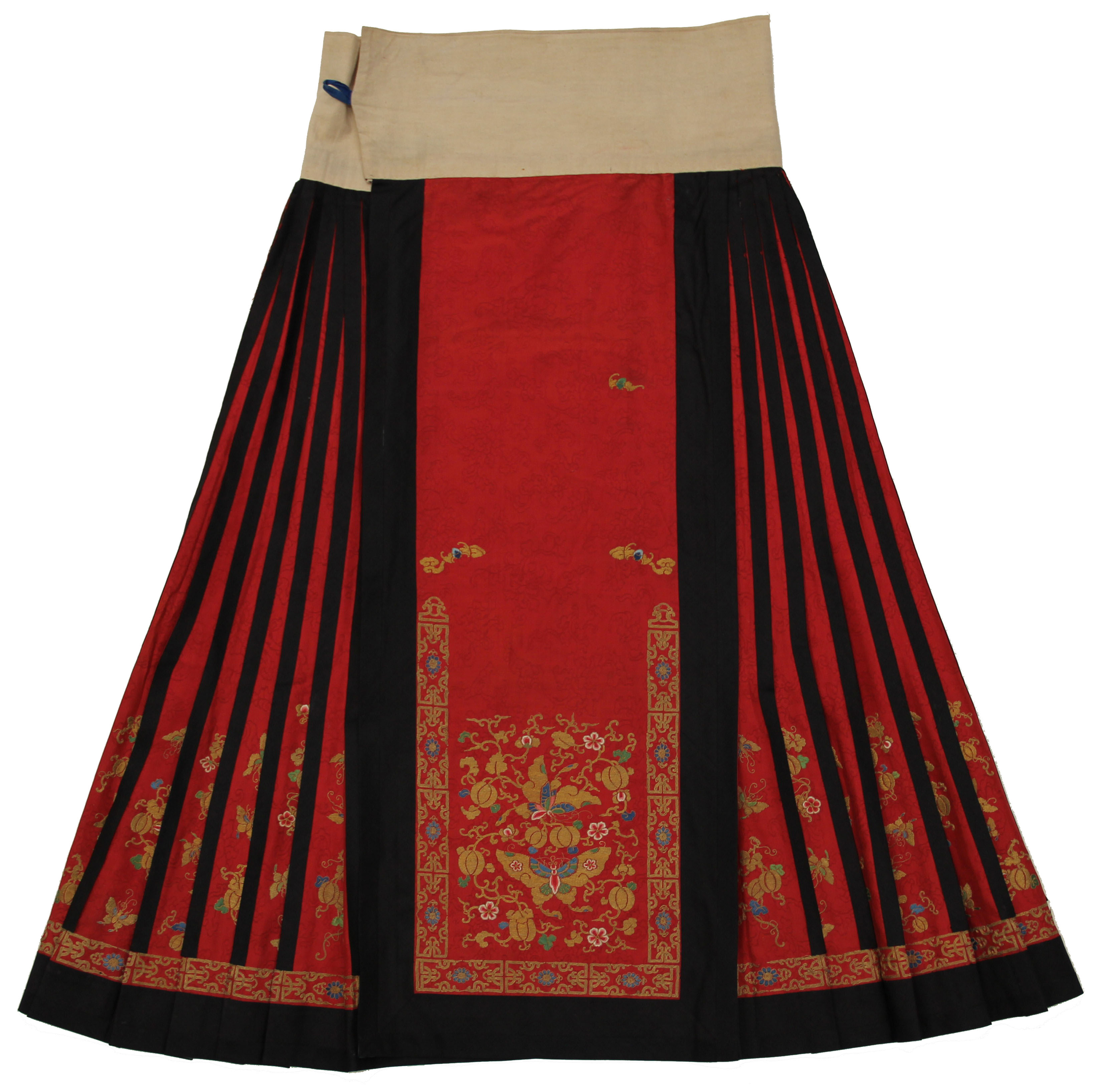
- A style of Han Chinese qun, Qing dynasty, 19th century, from the collection of the Metropolitan Museum of Art

Chinese name
- Chinese: 裙
- Literal meaning: Skirt
Transcriptions
Standard Mandarin
- Hanyu Pinyin: Qún
Yue: Cantonese
- Jyutping: kwan4

Chang
- Chinese: 裳
Transcriptions

English name
- English: Apron

Qun (Chinese: 裙; pinyin: qún; Jyutping: kwan4; lit. 'skirt'), referred to as cháng (裳) prior to the Han dynasty, chang (常) and xiachang (下常), and sometimes referred to as an apron, is a generic term that refers to the Chinese skirts used in Hanfu, especially those worn as part of ruqun, and in Chinese opera costume.

The qun and its predecessor, the chang, along with the upper garment called yi and the trousers called ku, are all indigenous clothing of the Zhongyuan, which conformed to the fashion style of the Chinese civilization in ancient times. Both the qun and the chang, were both typically in the form of a wrap-around skirt like an apron. However, throughout Chinese history, the chang eventually evolved into the qun; and the qun evolved in diverse shapes, styles, and construction throughout the succeeding dynasties. The qun continued to exist even in the Republic of China.

Several forms of ancient style qun regained popularity in the 21st century following the Hanfu Movement; this also inspired the development of new styles of qun with modern aesthetics and shapes.

== Terminology ==
When viewed in a broad sense, the Chinese character "qun" (裙) can be considered a synonym for the word "qúnzi" (裙子). Both of these words are considered generic terms for skirts in China.

In ancient China, the Chinese character chang (裳) can refer to "lower garments," which included both the trousers called ku and the qun skirt also called chang which also use the same character 裳. The term qun with the Chinese character 帬 also referred to skirt . According to the Fangyan, the qun (帬) was called pei (帔) in the area of Wei and Chen; it was also called bai (襬) by some people from the east of the Pass. The Shuowen jiezi also explains that the term qun which uses the character 帬 is the same as the term xiachang which uses the characters 下常. It also explains that the chang, which uses the Chinese character 常, is a skirt by using the term xiaqun with the characters 下帬.

There are also specific terms which are related to the qun, such as chenqun (衬裙; 'inner skirt / petticoat') and danqun. The danqun is a generic term which refers to unlined skirts. The chenqun is a generic term which typically refer to a form of inner skirt.

== History ==
In the ancient times, the qun was referred as chang and existed even prior to the creation of the trousers called ku. The chang appeared on unearthed artifacts dating as early as the Shang dynasty; the chang eventually evolved into what became known as the qun.

=== Warring states period and Qin dynasty ===
In the Warring States period, men could also wear short skirts similar to a kilt.

=== Han dynasty ===
Several wrap-over qun were found in the Han dynasty tombs. The zhějiǎnqúnqún (褶裥裙; 'pleated skirt') first appeared in the Eastern Han dynasty. According to the story, however, the wearing of short skirts with pleats first appeared in the Western Han dynasty when Feng Wufang saved Zhao Feiyan from falling; but while saving her, her skirt had been ripped. This led to the creation of a long excessively pleated-style zhejianqun, called liuxianqun, which was inspired by the ripped skirt of Zhao Feiyan and became popular.

=== Song dynasty ===
After the Sui and Tang dynasty, the pleats which were used in the zhejianqun increased in numbers, from a few dozens to over one hundred forming the baizhequn. The tomb of Huang Sheng contains various forms of qun, such as the liangpianqun and the baizhequn.

=== Yuan dynasty ===
The baizhequn continued to be worn in the Yuan dynasty.

=== Qing dynasty ===
The qun continued to be worn in the Qing dynasty. In this period, the qun worn by the Han Chinese were often mamianqun which featured pleats and embroideries at the panels and decorative borders. The late Qing dynasty qun were also heavier compared to those worn in the earlier times as they were weighted by the embroideries and pleats.

=== Republic of China ===
During the early period of the Republic of China, people in Beijing continued to wear the clothing worn in the Qing dynasty. Women continued to wear the qun; however, the qun had evolved in style and had become shorter.

== Types and styles in Hanfu ==
The qun can also have specific names based on the styles, design and constructions, the number of pleats and colours. In Hanfu, the qun can be used in set of attire, such as the ruqun, qungua, xiuhefu. In some dynasties, the qun could be found very long and was tied under the armpits either below or above the bust regions; for example, in the qixiong ruqun. In other dynasties, the qun could be tied at the waist level.

=== Poqun ===
Poqun (破裙; 'broken skirt') are a form of qun which are made out of several panel of fabric sewn together instead of using a single piece of cloth, similar to a gore skirt.

==== Danqun and chenqun ====
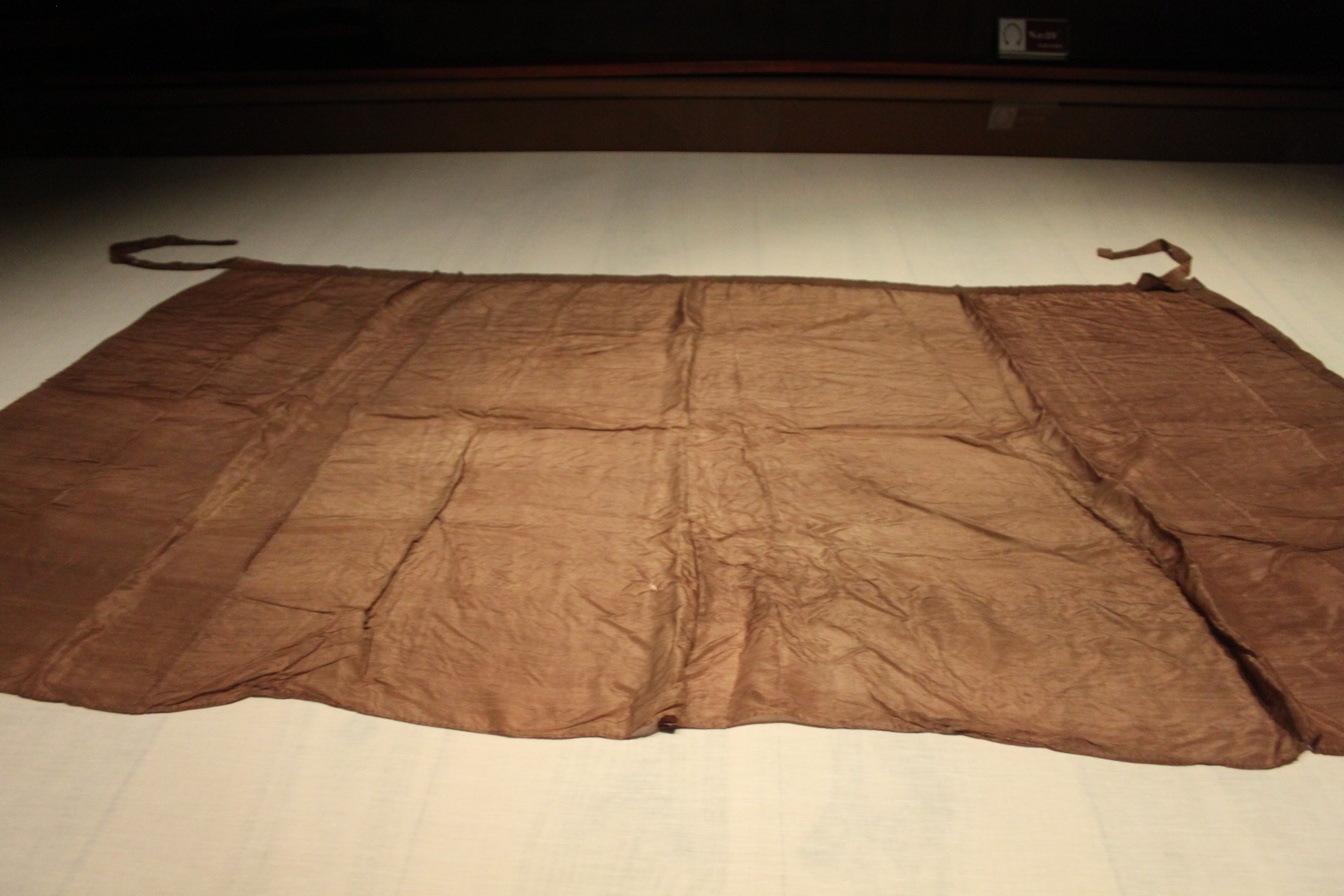
A four-panel danqun made of thin silk, Mawangdui tomb No.1, Western Han dynasty

In the Qin and Han dynasties, the danqun were made out of four panel of fabrics which were sewn together. The upper parts were narrower than the lower parts; and there were also two pieces in the middle were also narrower than those which were found at the sides of the danqun. It was most often found with a belt attached to it; however some women preferred to use a separate belt.

The four-panel poqun, as the one found in the Mawangdui tomb No.1 dating from the Western Han dynasty, was used as a form of chenqun (衬裙) and was usually worn over the zhijupao or under the qujupao. This form of poqun also had a waist belt which was sewed at the upper part of the skirt and both ends of the waist belt would extend to form the ties.

==== Jiansequn ====
Jiansequn (間色裙; 'inter-coloured skirt') are a form of poqun made of alternative strips of fabric of two different colours sewn together. Its structure can be traced back to the late Northern Wei dynasty and continued to be used until the Five dynasties and Ten kingdoms period. This form of skirt was high-waist during the Sui and the Tang dynasties and were characteristics clothing for women during this time period. The evolution process of the Jiansequn reflects the multiculturalism context, the cultural exchange, and the cultural integration which occurred between the Han Chinese, the northern ethnic minority culture, and the culture of the Western regions which occurred from the late Northern Wei dynasty to the Sui and Tang dynasties. The design of the skirt thus reflects the gradual integration of Hanfu and Hufu.

Various forms of Jiansequn

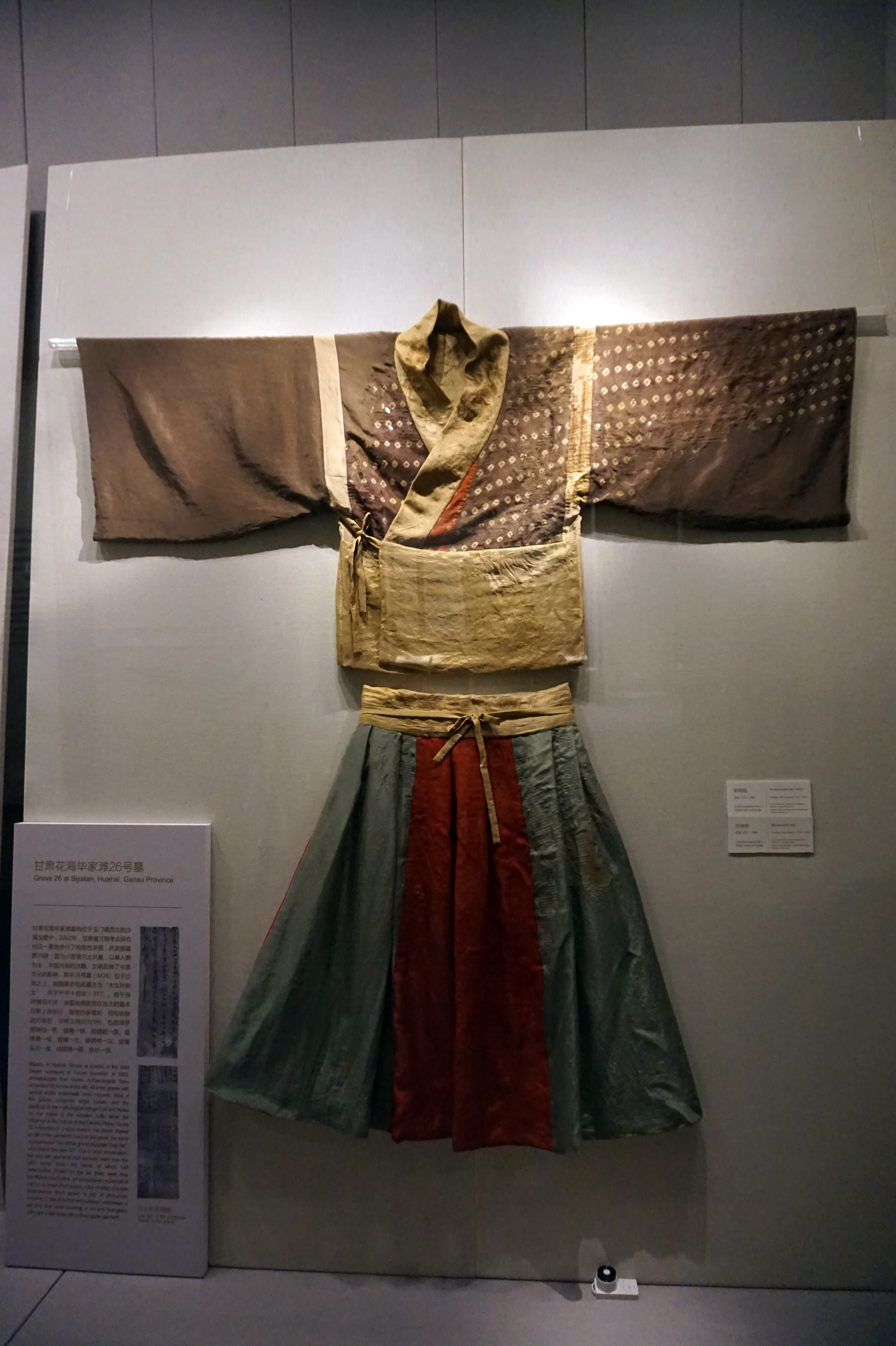
A waist-length Jiansequn, former Qin

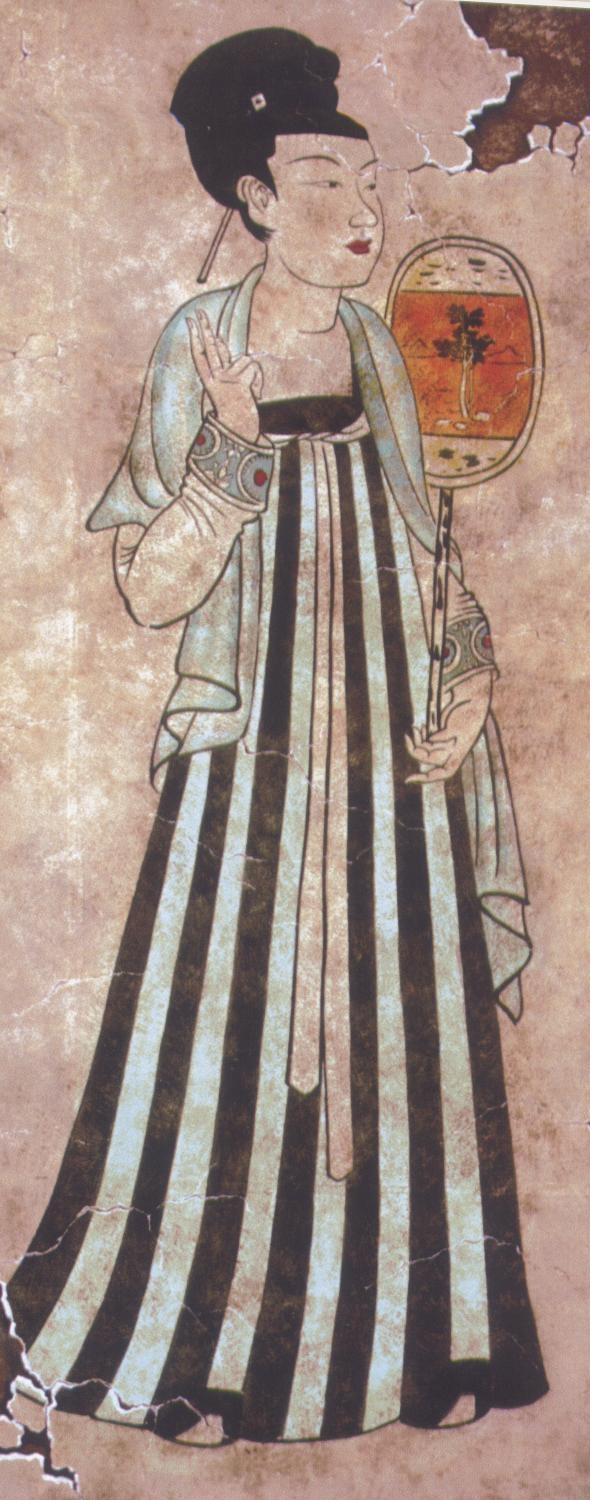
A floor-length jiansequn tied above the bust-level, Tang dynasty.

=== Zhejianqun ===
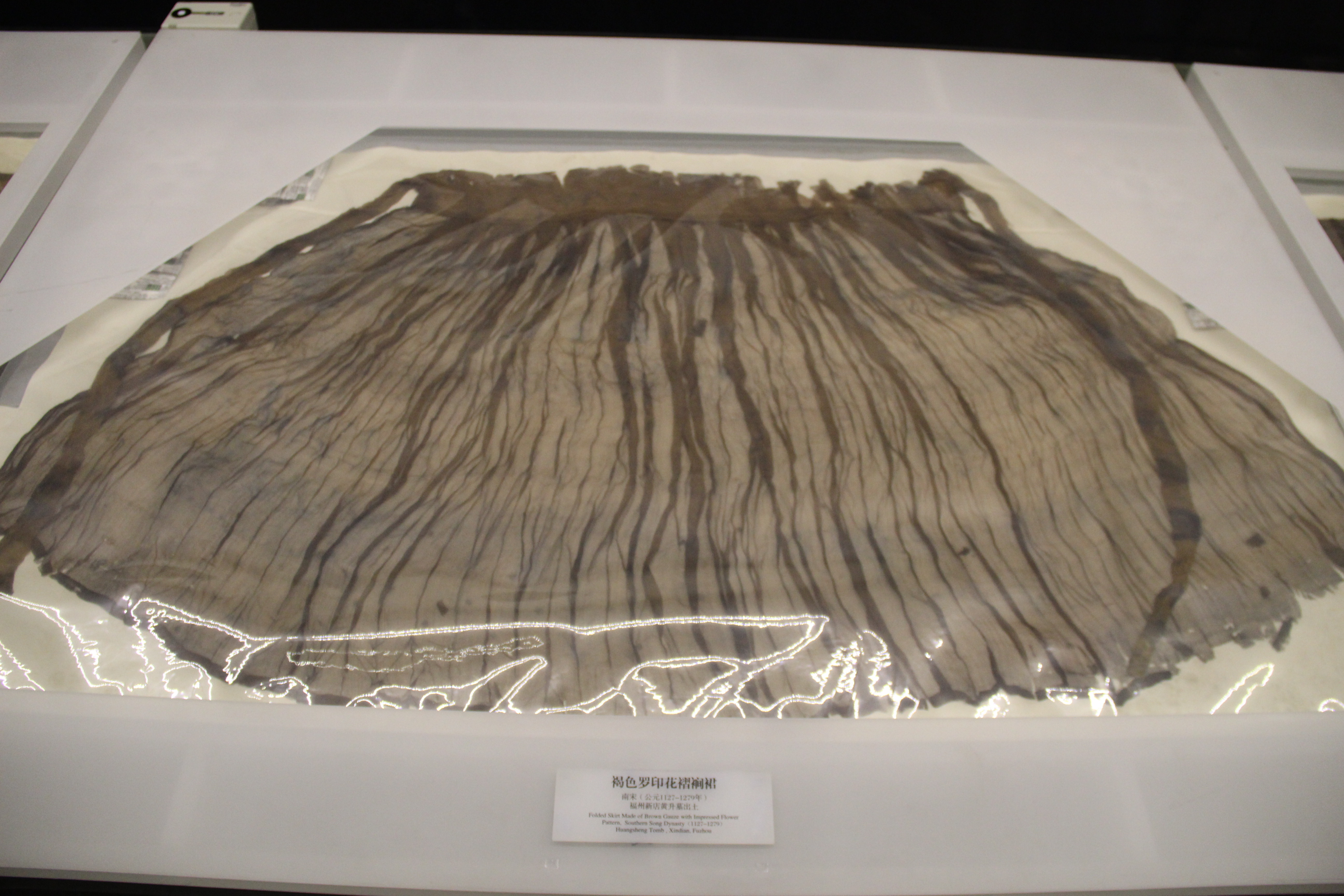
Zhejianqun made of gauze, Southern Song dynasty.

Pleated skirts are called zhějiǎnqúnqún (褶裥裙; 'pleated skirt'). There are several forms of zhejianqun, such as the baizhequn (百褶裙), and the baidiequn.

Zhejianqun used in qungua

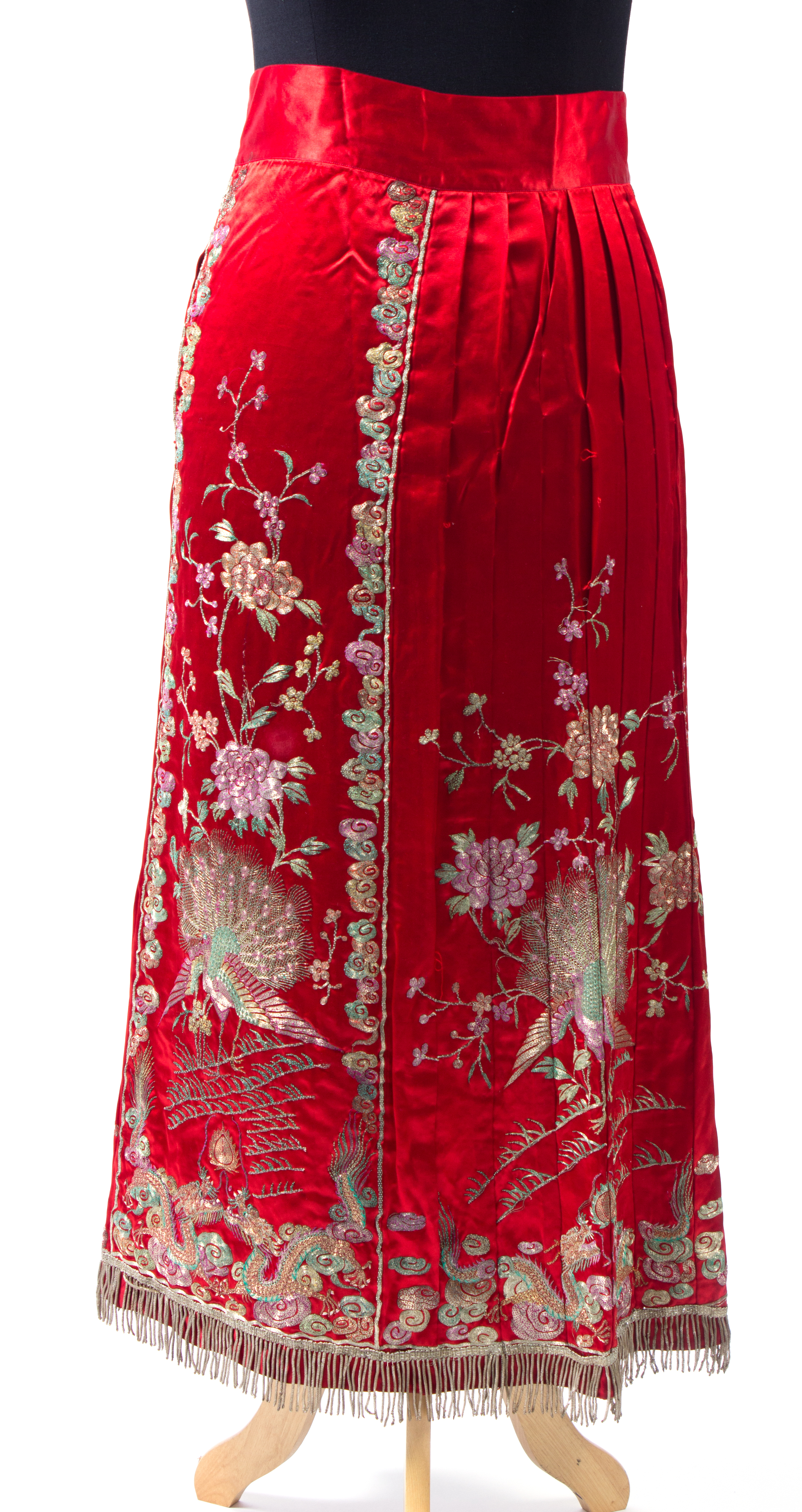
Zhejianqun used in qungua, c.1928

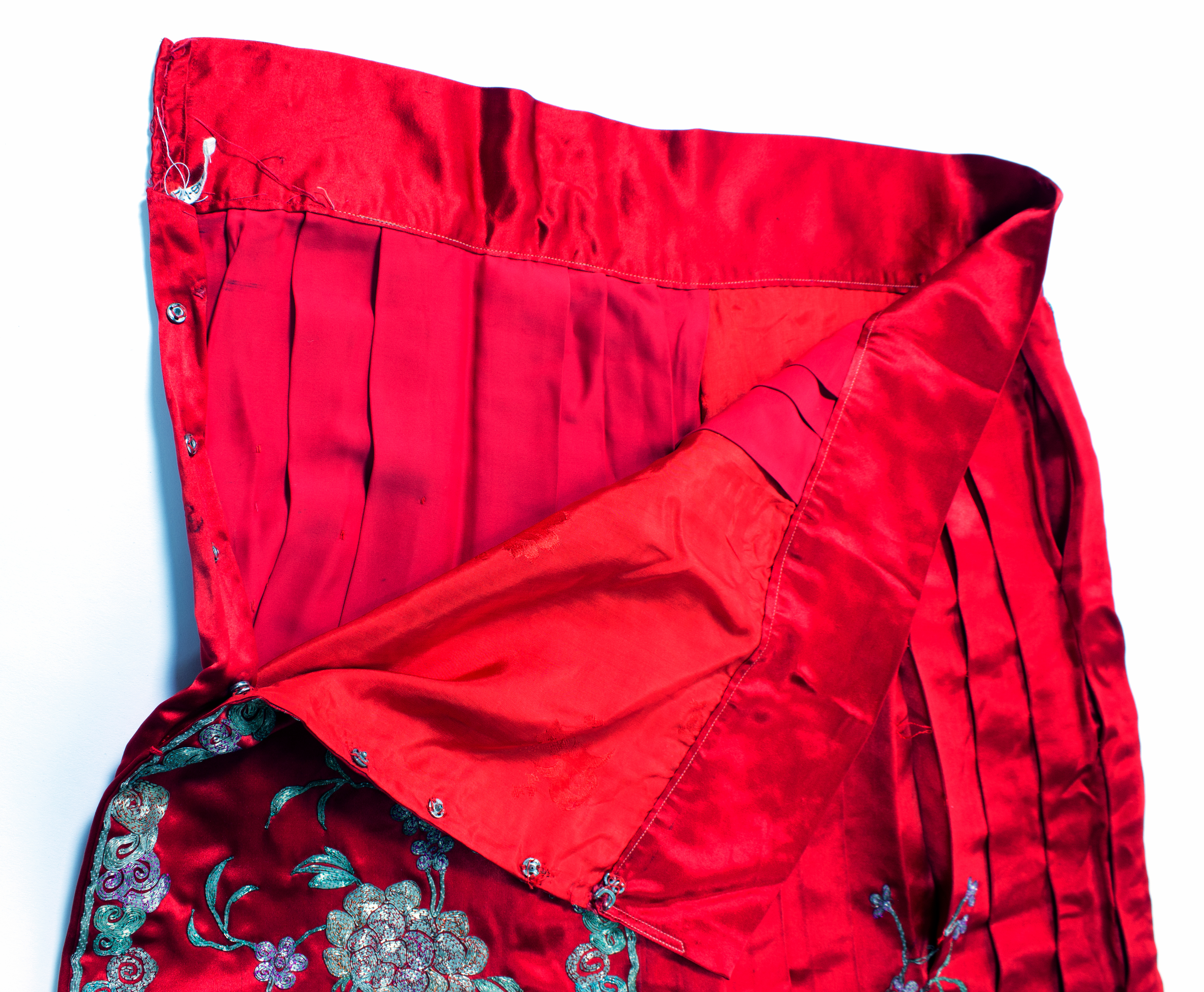
Zhejianqun used in qungua is closed with a zipper, c.1928

==== Baizhequn ====
Baizhequn is a form of wrap-around skirt which was tied at the waist level; it consisted of over 100 pleats in numbers. Each pleats were fixed to the waistband of the skirt and each pleats had the same width.

==== Mamianqun and its variant ====
The mamianqun was a wrap-around skirt composed of two overlapping panels of fabric which was tied at the waist level. It was characterized with a flat front and pleats on the two sides. The yulinqun "fish-scale skirt") was a variant of the mamianqun and featured small pleats which gave a ripple effects. The early prototypes of the mamianqun was the baidiequn and the liangpianqun. A derivative of the mamianqun is the skirt used in the Xiuhefu, which is also called mamianqun. (Note: See page Xiuhefu for references and detailed explanation)

Various styles of mamianqun and its derivatives

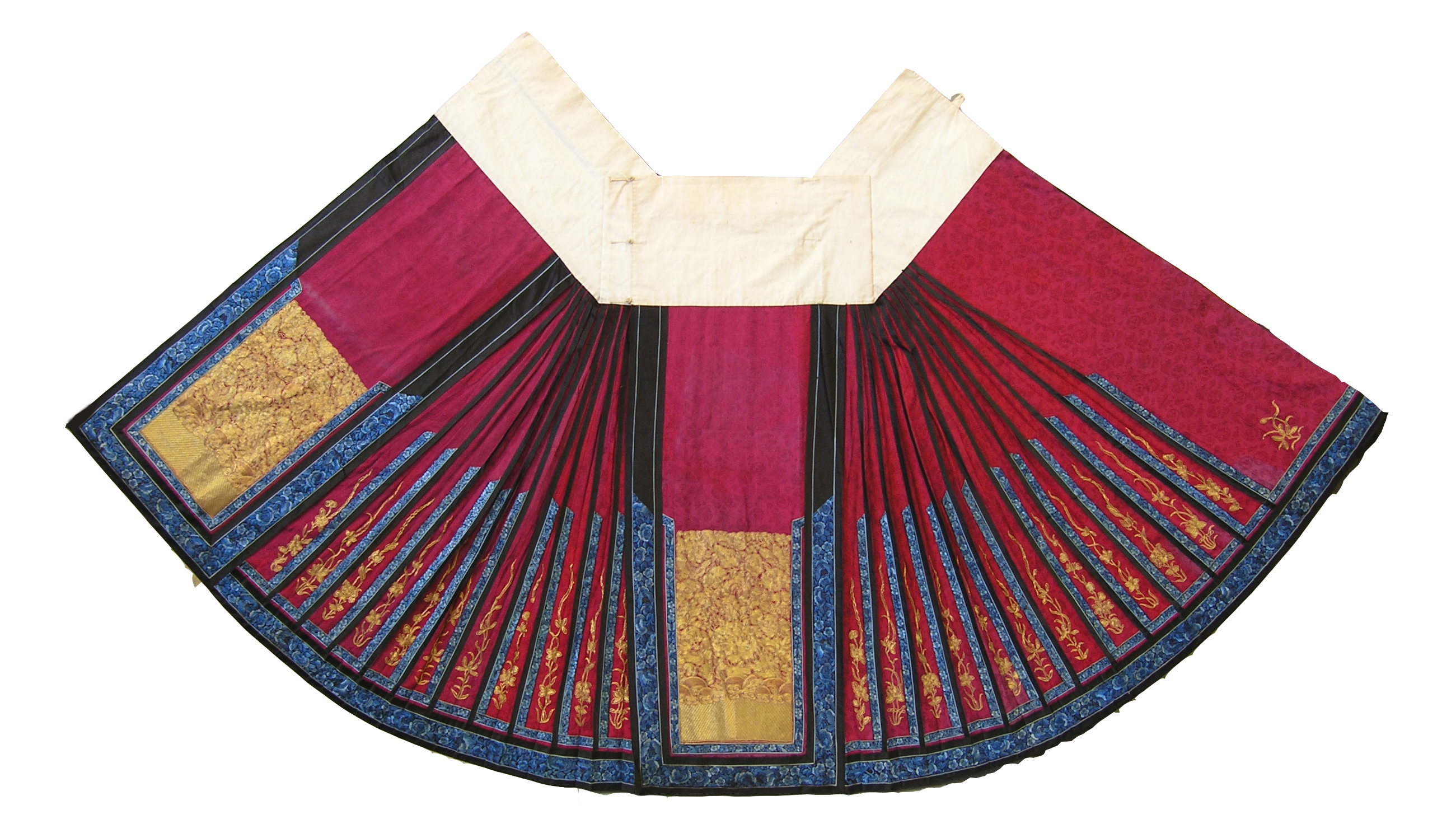
Standard mamianqun, Qing dynasty

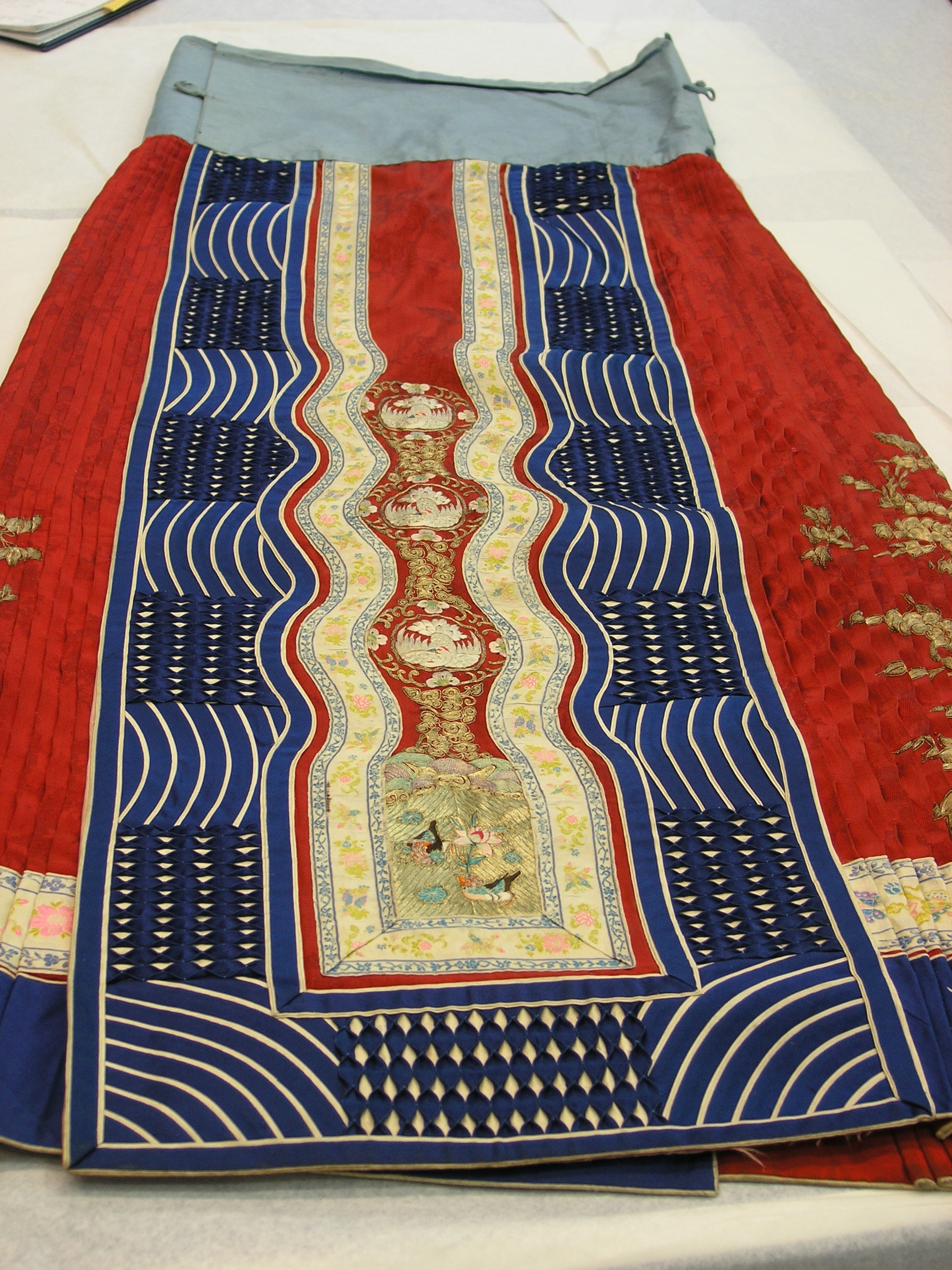
Yulinqun, Qing dynasty, late 19th century

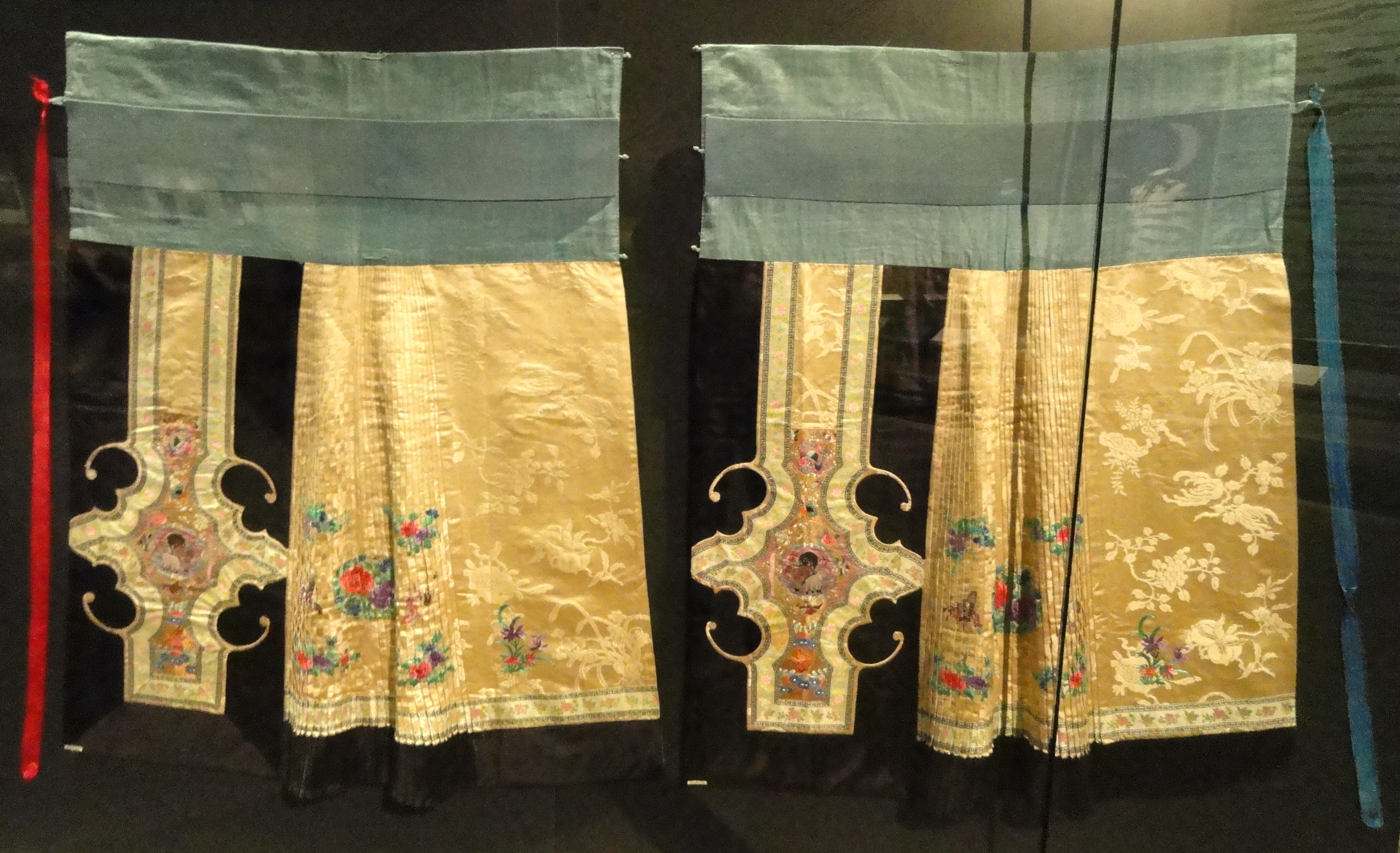
Yulin baizhequn, Qing dynasty

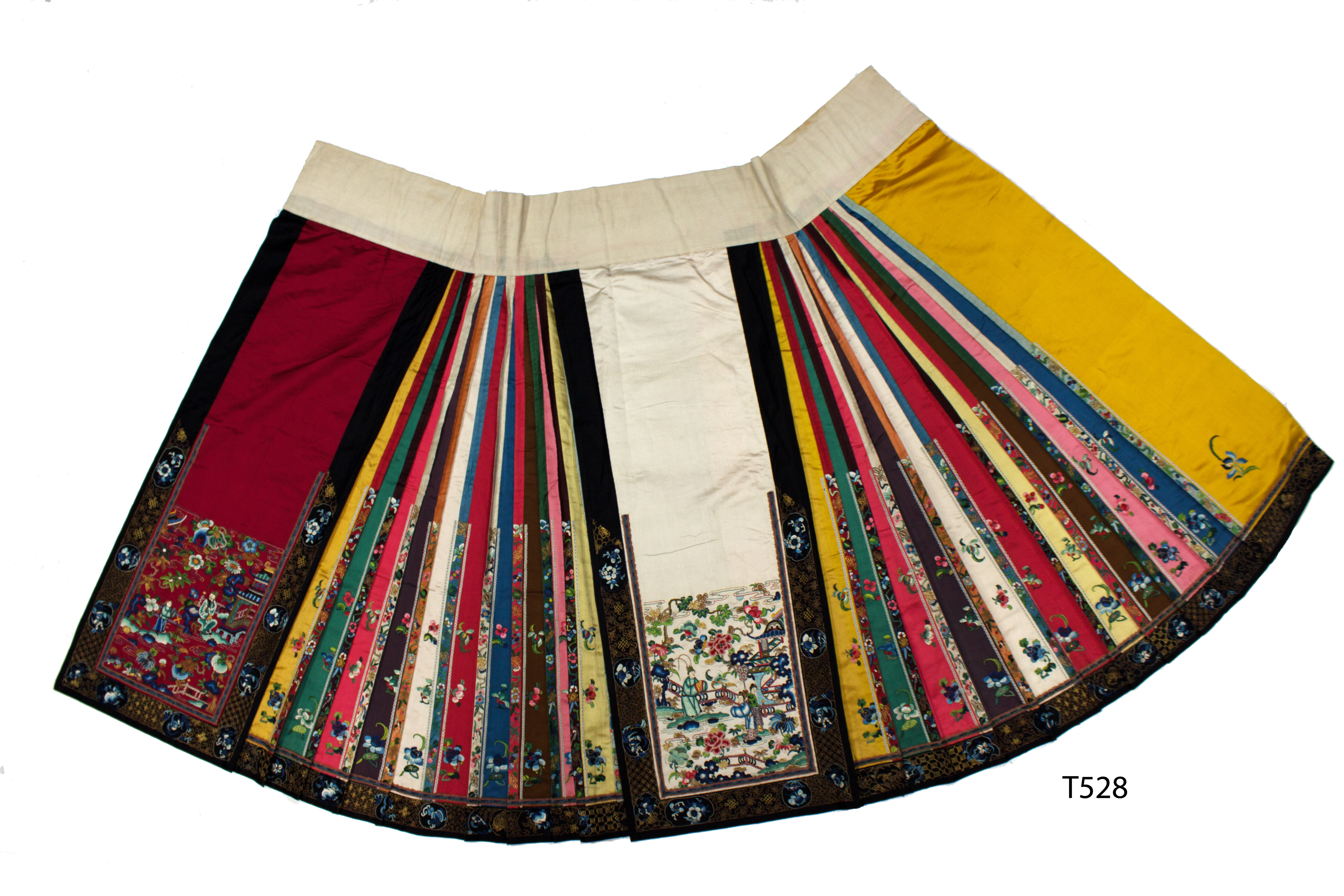
Yuehuaqun (月華裙)

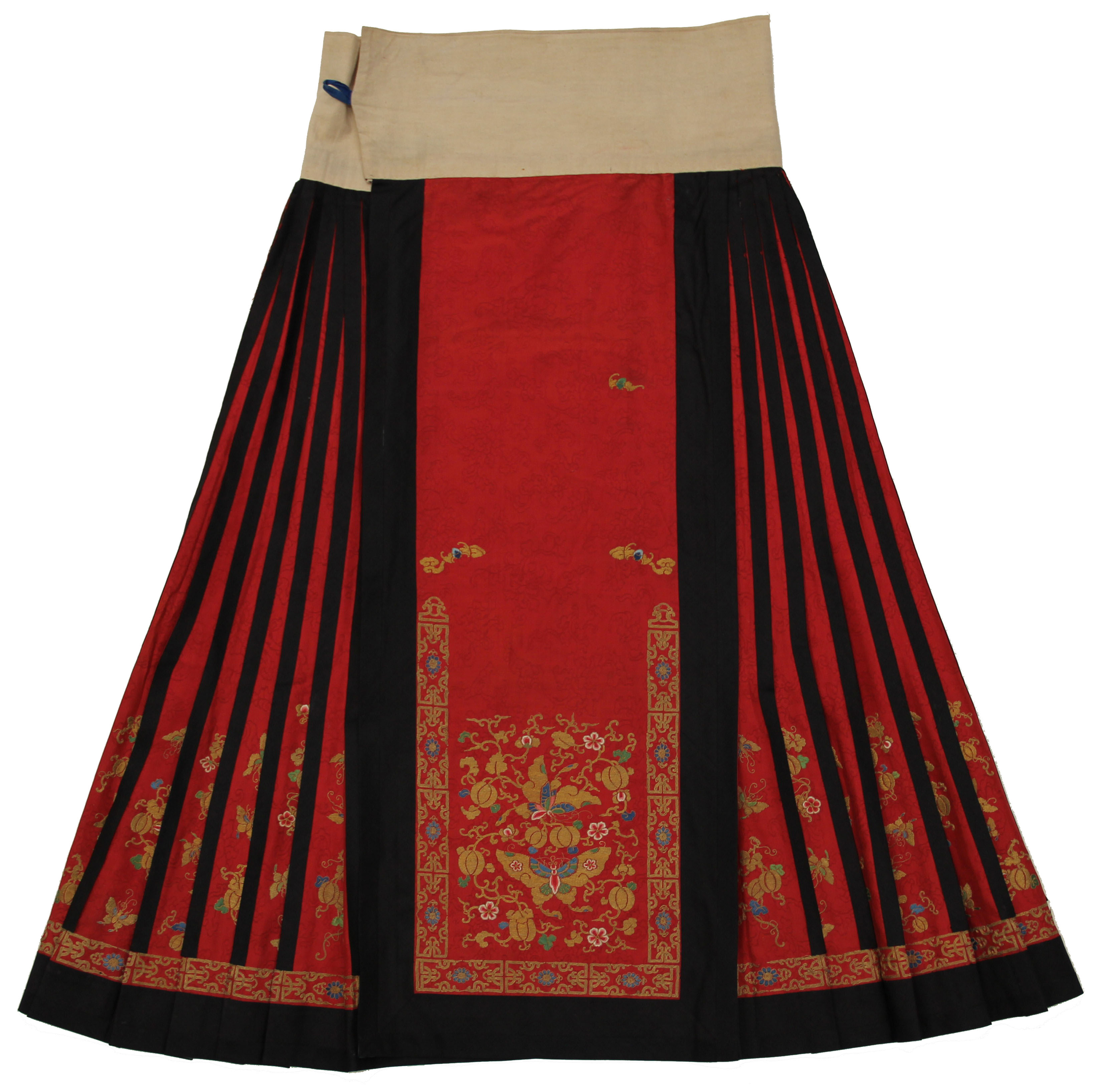
Langanqun

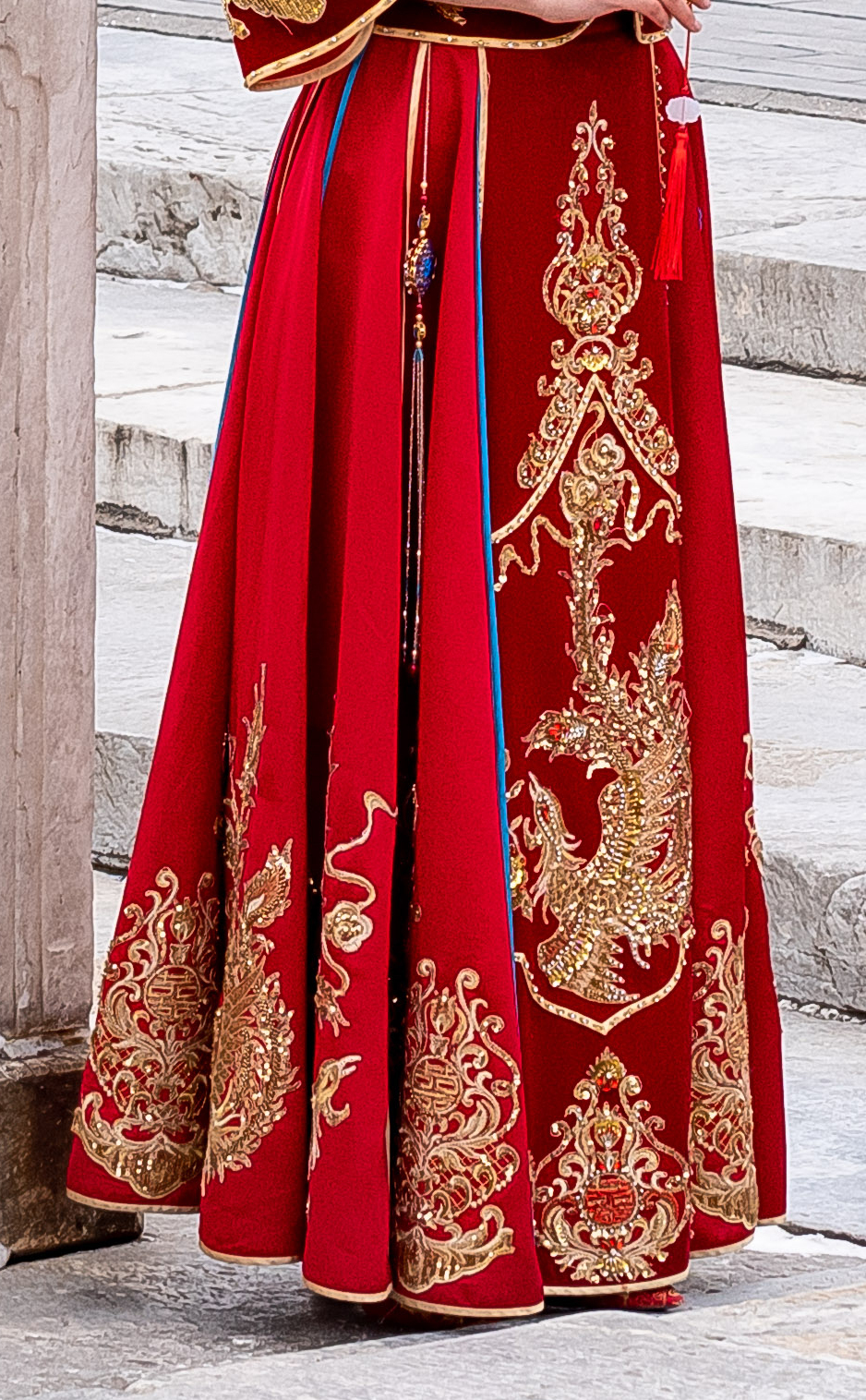
Mamianqun used in the Xiuhefu, a derivative of the Qing dynasty mamianqun.

===== Mangchu =====
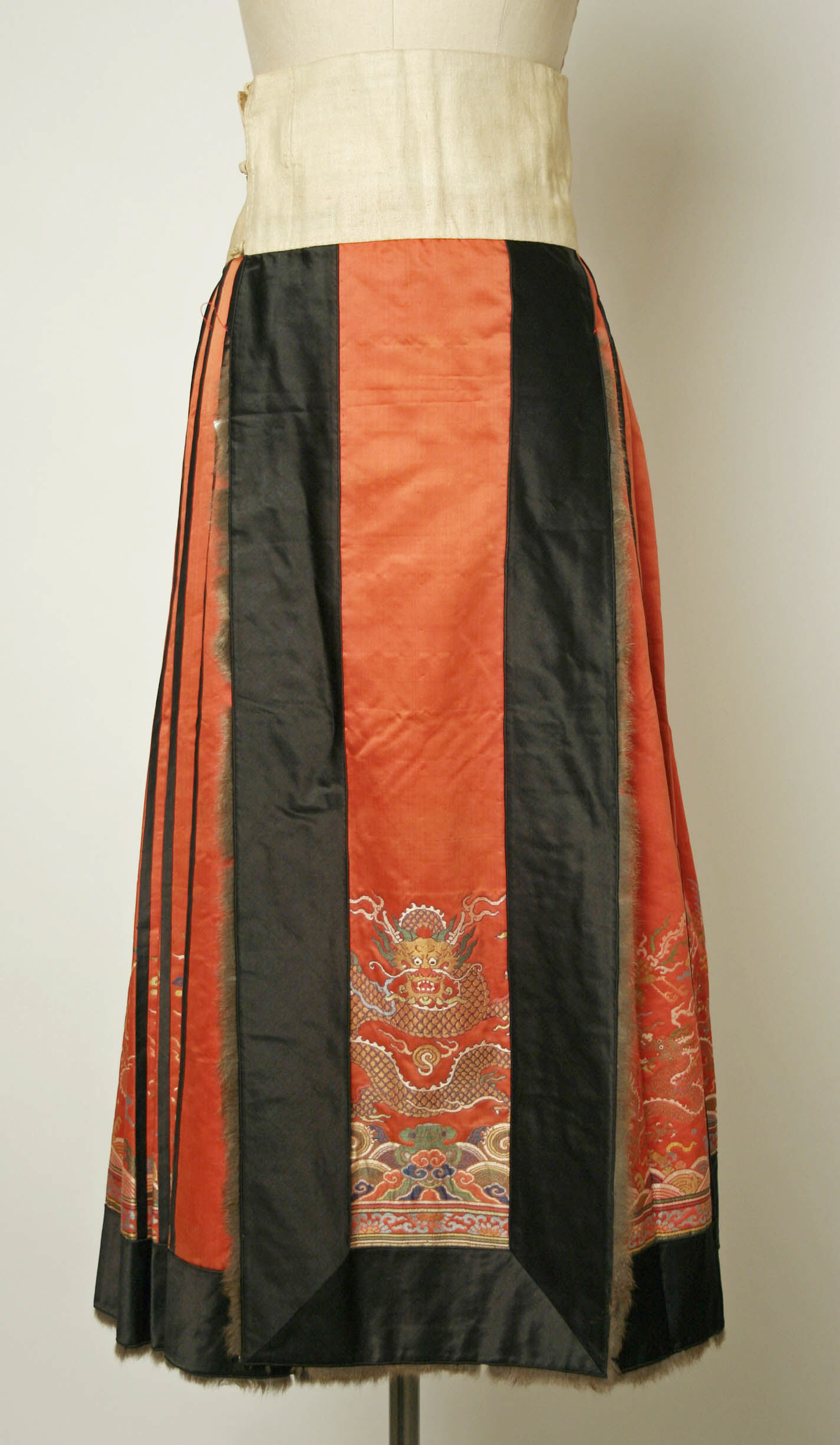
Mangchu with mang (front view)

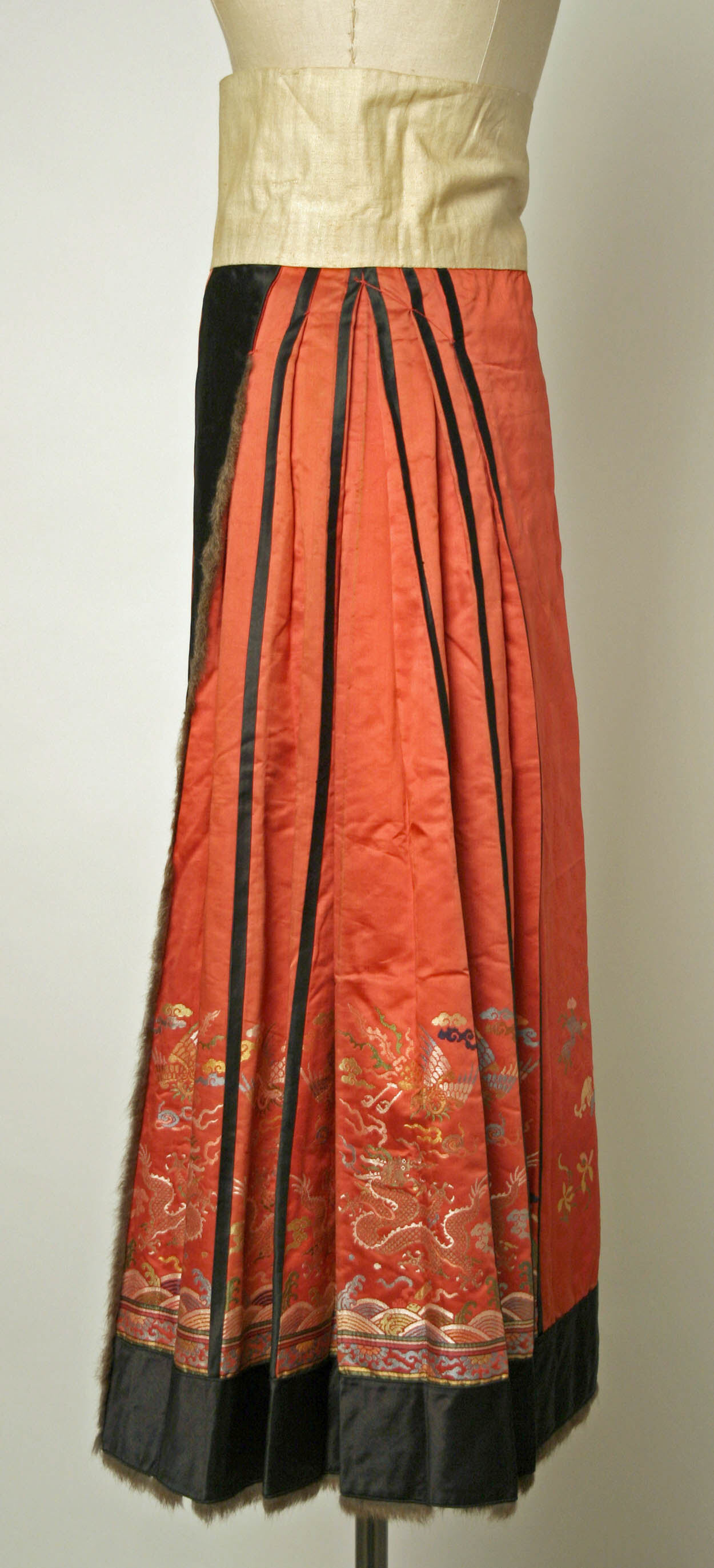
Mangchu with mang (side view)

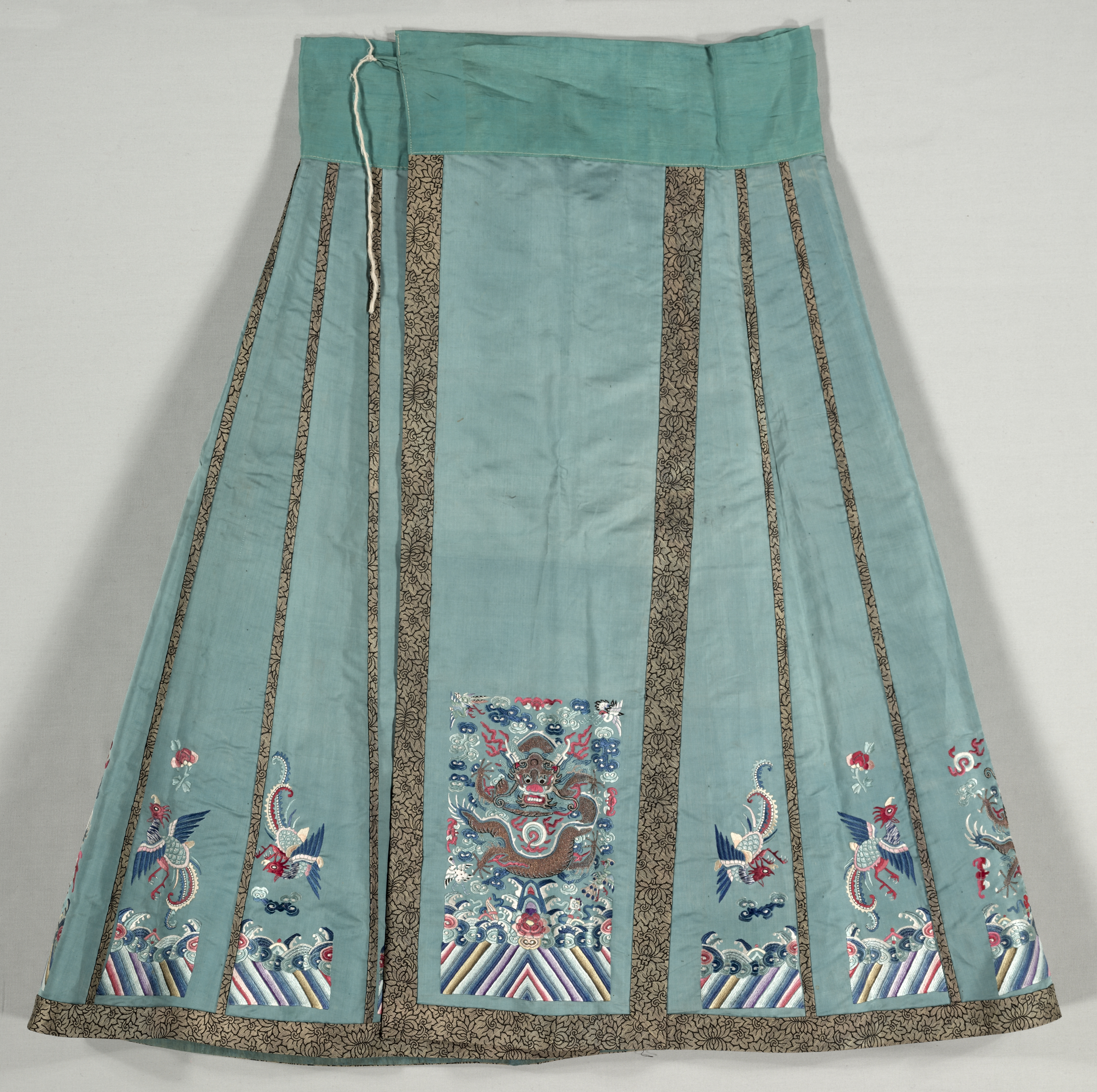
Mangchu with Chinese dragons

Mangchu, Qing dynasty

The mangchu skirt, sometimes literally translated as "Dragon skirt" in English, was a skirt decorated with Chinese dragons and/or Chinese phoenixes or with mang ("python"). The mangchu could typically vary in colour; however, red and green were the most common colours used. The mangchu was typically paired with the mangao jacket.

During the Qing dynasty, the mangchu was worn by Han Chinese women; it was typically worn by the wives of Chinese noblemen or wives of high-ranking Qing officials as part of their quasi-official formal clothing attire on ceremonial occasions when their husband would be wearing the Qing dynasty court robe attire. Wives of the Qing dynasty officials also wore the mangchu as part of their wedding attire and as their burial attire.

=== Shiliqun ===
The shiliqun (石榴裙; 'pomegranate red') was a red skirt which was especially popular in the Tang dynasty.

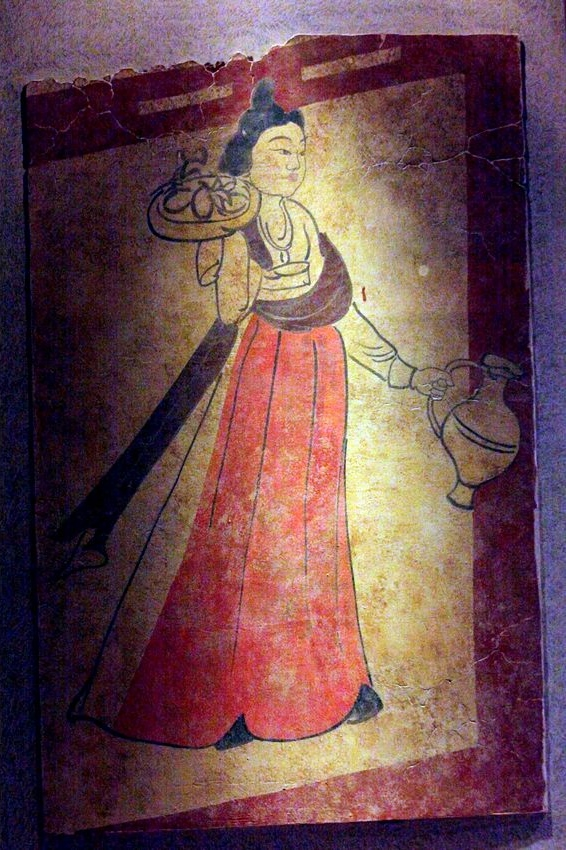
Shiliuqun (石榴裙)

=== Imperial and court attire ===
Various form of qun used in imperial and court attire

== Types and styles in Xifu ==
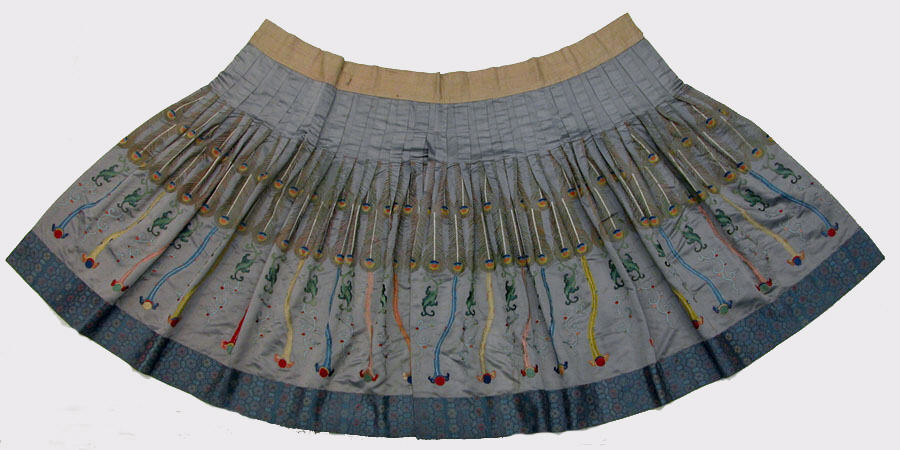
Zhejianqun used in xifu, Qing dynasty, 18th century

The qun was also used as a costume item in xifu. There are several forms of qun which are used as xifu by performing Chinese opera actors, which include the:

- Huadanqun (lit. 'flower female skirt') is worn with an ao by a huadan.
- Tongqun (lit. 'tube skirt'): a skirt which has the shape of a tube; it is often worn as outer skirt being worn over an inner skirt, which could be pleated skirt.

== Similar forms ==
- Chima – Korean equivalent

== See also ==
- Hanfu
- List of Hanfu
- Yaoqun
- Bixi
