= Shanku =

Chinese outfit composed of a top and trousers

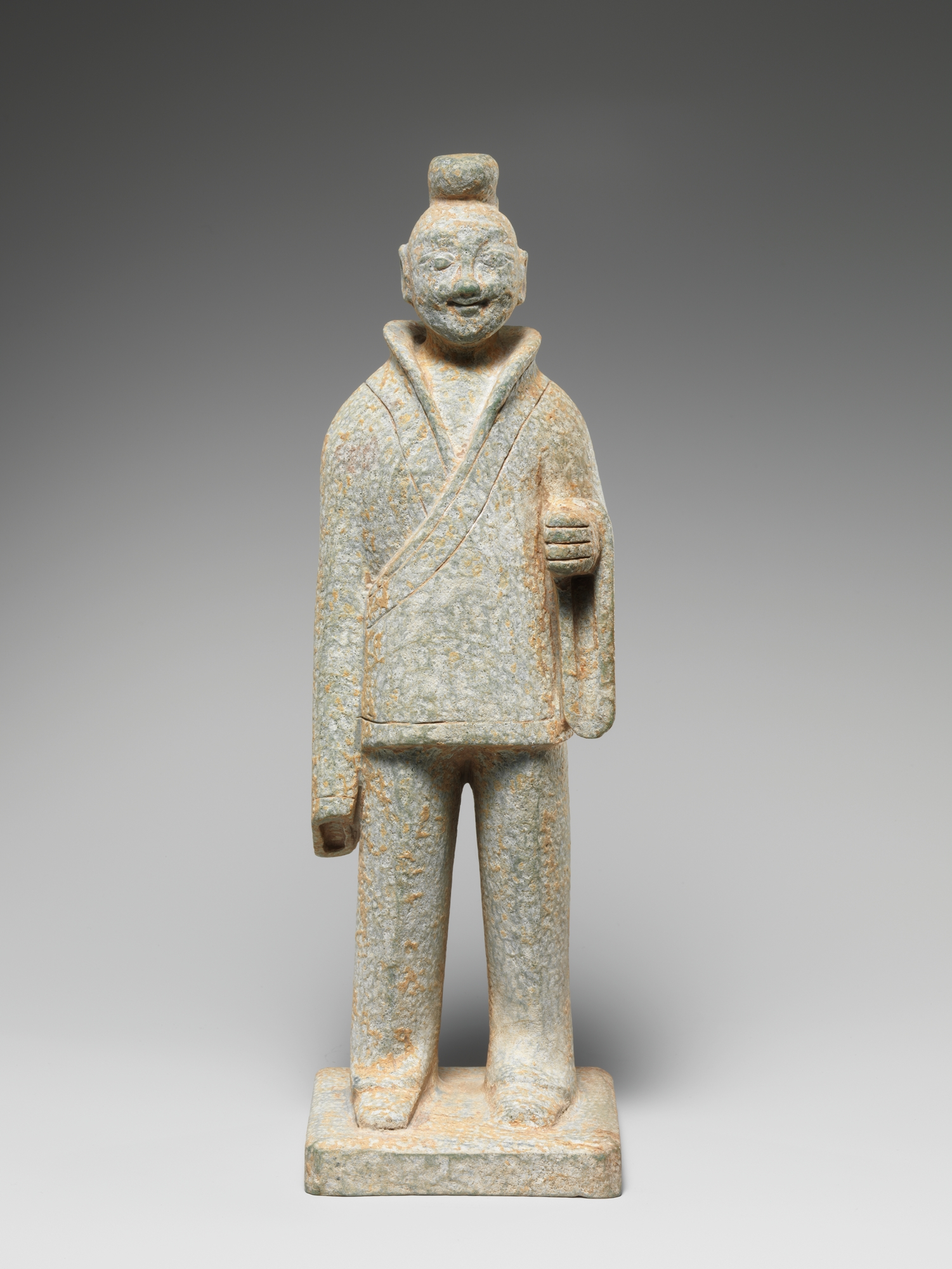
- A jiaoling youren shanku worn by a civil official, Western Jin

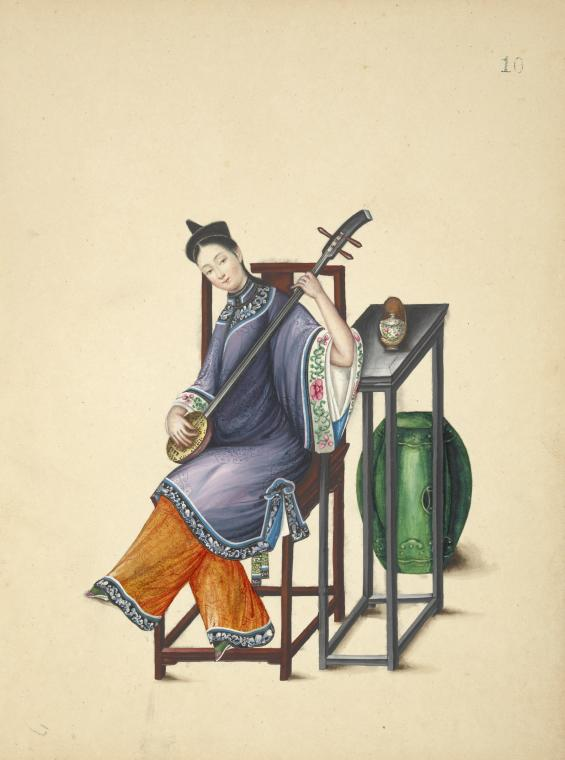
- Illustration of a woman wearing a pianjin shanku from 1800s

Chinese name
- Traditional Chinese: 衫褲
- Simplified Chinese: 衫褲
- Literal meaning: Shirt and trousers
Transcriptions
Standard Mandarin
- Hanyu Pinyin: Shānkù
Hakka
- Pha̍k-fa-sṳ: sâm-fu
Yue: Cantonese
- Jyutping: saam1 fu3
Southern Min
- Hokkien POJ: saⁿ-khò͘

English name
- English: Samfoo (British English) / Samfu / Aoku

Shanku (simplified Chinese: 衫裤; traditional Chinese: 衫褲; pinyin: shānkù; lit. 'shirt trousers'; see terminology) is a generic term which refers to a two-piece set of attire in Hanfu, which is typically composed of a yòurèn yī (右衽衣), (Note: Yi is typically literally translated as "clothing" nowadays; however, in ancient times, it was used to refer to "upper clothing"; see page Ru for more details.) a Chinese upper garment which typically overlaps and closes on the right side which could be called shan (衫), ru (襦), ao (袄; 襖), and a pair of long trousers called ku (裤; 褲). As a form of daily attire, the shanku was mainly worn by people from lower social status in China, such as labourers, shopkeepers, or retainers from wealthy households. The shanku was originally worn by both genders. Up until the mid-20th century, it was popular in China and outside of China where it was worn by overseas Chinese in countries, such as Singapore, Malaysia, Suriname, etc. It is still worn in present-day China and can be found in rural areas.

== Terminology ==
Shanku is sometimes referred as aoku (袄裤; 襖褲; 'coat trousers'), ruku (襦裤; 襦褲; 'jacket trousers'), and also known as samfu in English or samfoo (pronunciation: / (ˈsæmfuː) /) in British English following its Cantonese spelling.

The terms duanda (短打), duanhe (短褐; 'short brown') or shuhe (竖褐; 'vertical brown') typically refer to the two-piece set composed of an upper garment which is generally above and below the hips and knees and a pair of trousers, both made out of coarse cloth. This was generally worn by people doing manual labour, such as farm work, and by martial artists.

The generic term kuzhe (袴褶; 'jacket trousers'), also called kuxi (袴褶), is typically used to refer to military or riding style attire which is composed of a jacket or coat and trousers. According to the Shiming, the coat, xi (褶); (sometimes referred to as zhe, typically used as part of the kuxi), was a xi (襲). A xi (襲) was a paofu with a zuoren closure according to the Shuowen Jiezi (說文解字). The term daxi (大褶; 'big coat') also existed, but they were only long enough to cover the knees, which suggest that the other forms of xi were shorter than knee-length. Although the kuxi/kuzhe attire were oftentimes associated with Hufu, some of these garment items and styles were in fact Chinese innovations.

=== English definition ===
In the English language, shanku is commonly written as samfoo in British English or samfu. According to the Collins English Dictionary, the term samfu (pronounced: /ˈsæmfuː/) originated from the combination of the Chinese (Cantonese) words sam (dress) and fu (trousers).

The Oxford Advanced Learner's Dictionary and the Concise Oxford English Dictionary indicate that the term samfu originated in the 1950s from the Cantonese term shaam foò, with shaam meaning 'coat' and foò meaning 'trousers'. Among English dictionaries, there are variations in the definition of samfu. The Collins English Dictionary defines it as being:

"A style of casual dress worn by Chinese women, consisting of a waisted blouse and trousers".

The Oxford Learner's Advanced Dictionary defines it as being:

"A light suit consisting of a jacket with a high collar and loose trousers, traditional in China".

The 12th edition of the Concise Oxford English Dictionary defines it as being:

"A suit consisting of high-necked jacket and loose trousers, worn by Chinese women".

== Design and construction ==
The shanku is a two-piece set of attire, which is composed of a jacket as an upper garment and a pair of trousers as a lower garment. More precisely, the shanku is composed of the shan and the trousers generally known as ku.

The shan and the ku were typically made of similar fabrics. However, the two garments were sometimes made separately and did not belong to the same set of clothing.

=== Upper garment ===
The shan (衫) or ao (袄; 襖) or ru (襦) or yi (衣) all refer to a Chinese upper garment, which typically has a side fastening to the right, known as youren.

Styles of Chinese upper garment

Illustration of shan (衫) from the Chinese encyclopedia Gujin Tushu Jicheng, between 1700 and 1725 AD

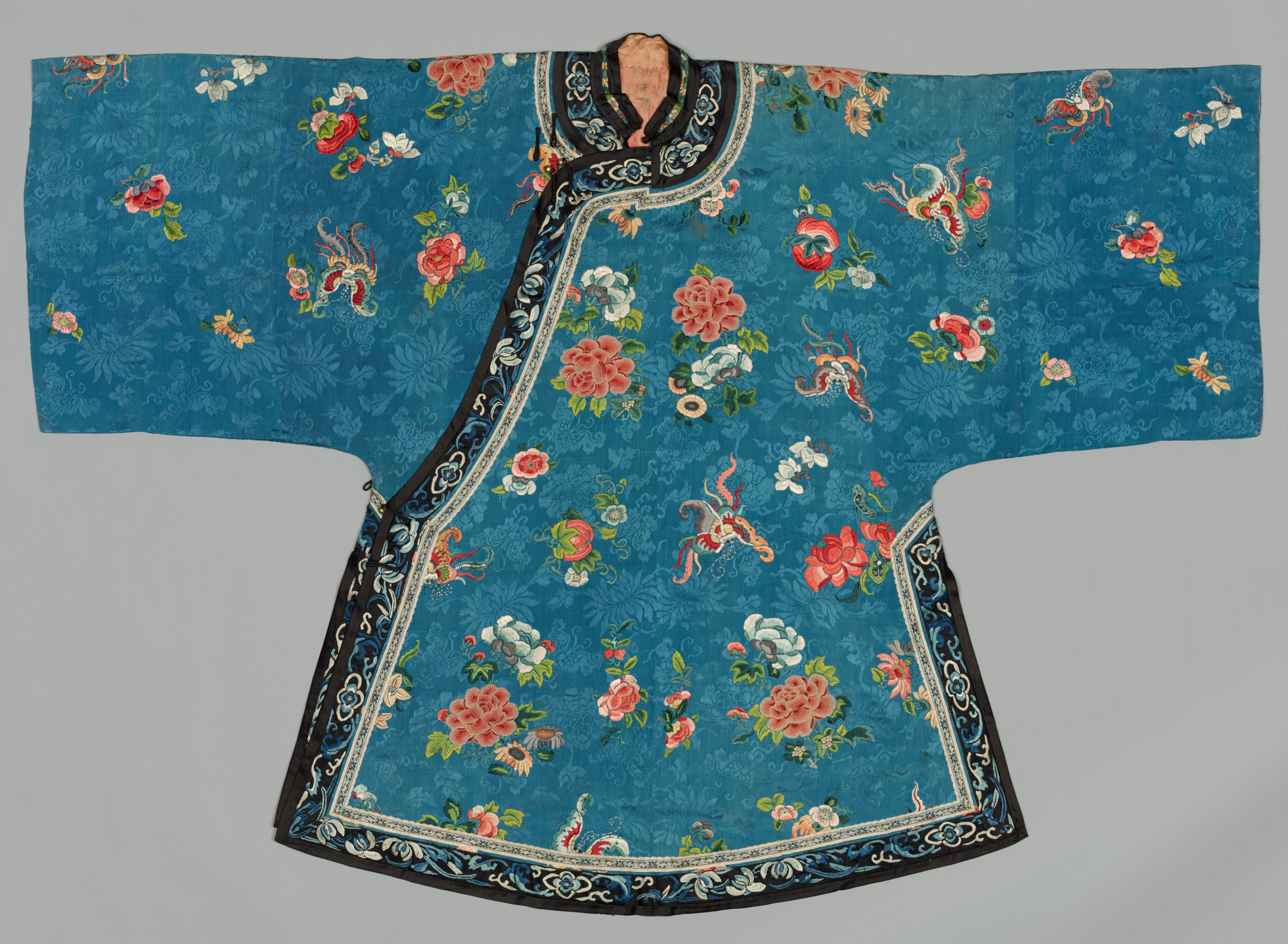
Han woman's jacket (袄) with a slanted opening and high collar, 19th century

Jiaoling youren style (left) vs. pianjin style (right)

Prior to the Qing dynasty, the shape of the collar and closure of the upper garment were typically jiaoling youren, a collar which crosses or overlaps in the front and closed to the right side similar to the letter y in shape, as the ones worn in the Ming dynasty and earlier, instead of the pianjin-style, the curved or slanted overlap closure which appears similar to the letter s, which was commonly worn in the late Qing dynasty. The shan could have a mandarin collar or a high standing collar.

The shan could be long-sleeved, short-sleeved, or sleeveless depending on the time period. The sleeves could be wide or narrow, and the shape of the cuff could vary depending on styles and time period.

The bodice of the shan varied in length depending on the time period, but it could also be thigh-length.

=== Lower garment ===
The ku (裤; 褲), as a general term, was a pair of long trousers which could be loose or narrow. There are many types of ku with some having closed rises while others have opened rise. Trousers with close rises were typically referred as kun to differentiate from the ku which typically referred to trousers without rises.

=== Fitting ===
The shanku is traditionally loose in terms of fitting. However, due to the influence of Western fashion, it became more tight fitting in the 1950s and 1960s.

=== Colours ===
The shanku was typically dyed in black, blue or grey. The waistband of the ku was typically made of lighter coloured fabric, such as blue or white. However, the colours of the shanku could vary depending on ethnic groups.

== History and development ==
=== Pre-history ===
In the Neolithic period, the trousers were known as jingyi (胫衣) and were the original form of the ku without crotches. The form of the Neolithic jingyi was different from the trousers worn nowadays as it came in pairs of legs like shoes. They were knee-high trousers which were tied on the calves and only covered the knees and the ankles; thus allowing its wearer's thighs to be exposed; due to this reason, ancient Chinese wore yichang, a set of attire consisting of the yi and chang, on top of their jingyi to cover their lower body. This form of jingyi continued to be worn until the early Han dynasty.

=== Shang dynasty ===
The Hanfu can be traced back at least to the Shang dynasty. Prior to the introduction of foreigners' clothing, known as Hufu, during the Warring States period, a set of attire known as ruku (襦裤; 'jacket and trousers') was already worn by the ancient Chinese people. However, the lower garment called chang remained in use to cover the jingyi-style ku (Note: The term chang in a broad sense can refer to any to lower garments, including trousers and skirts. When chang is used over trousers, it typically refers to a skirt; upper garment with chang (skirt) form a set of attire called yichang. See page ruqun for more details.) as the trousers in this period still lacked a rise. In the Shang dynasty, the slaveholders wore a youren yi with ku and/or chang. The yi, which was worn, was similar to a knee-length tunic.

=== Zhou dynasty, Spring and Autumn period, and Warring States period ===
In the Zhou Li (周禮; "Rites of Zhou"), it is recorded that exorcists wore black trousers and red jackets.

==== Adoption of Hufu ====
During the Warring States period, King Wuling of Zhao (r. 326–298 BC) instituted the Hufuqishe (胡服騎射; 'Hu clothing and mounted archery') policies which involved the adoption of Hufu to facilitate horse riding.

The nomadic clothes adopted by King Wuling consisted of belts, short upper garment, and trousers. The Hufu introduced by King Wuling can be designated as shangxi xiaku (上褶下袴; 'short coat on upper body', 'trousers on lower body'). However, the style of trousers, which was introduced in Central China by King Wuling of Zhao, had a loose, close rise and differed from the indigenous Chinese ku; it is thus a style referred as kun (裈) instead of ku.

The short garment was a coat was called xi (褶; 'coat'), which appears to have been the outermost coat of all garment, resembling a robe with short body and loose sleeves. King Wuling was also known for wearing Hufu-style long trousers and upper garments with narrow sleeves.

===== Influence of Hufu =====
Under the influence of the kun, the jingyi-style ku evolved until the thighs were lengthened to cover the thighs forming a newly improved ku-trousers; it also had a waist enclosure which was added; however, as the improved ku-trousers still had an open rise and rear, which would allowed for excretion purposes, the yichang still continued to be worn on top of the ku. Compared to the nomadic kun which did not fit in the traditional norms of the Chinese people, the ku was well-accepted by the Chinese as it was more aligned with the Han Chinese tradition.

The trousers with loose rise, kun, which was adopted from the Hufuqishe policy was mainly worn by the military troops and servants while the general population typically continued to wear the jingyi-style ku and the newly improved ku. Thus, the nomadic-style kun never fully replaced the ku and was only worn by military and by the lower class. The nomadic-style loose rise kun later influenced the formation of other forms of kun trousers, such as dashao (i.e. trousers with extremely wide legs) which appeared in the Han dynasty and dakouku (i.e. trousers with tied strings under the knees). These forms of kun-trousers were Chinese innovations.

=== Qin dynasty ===
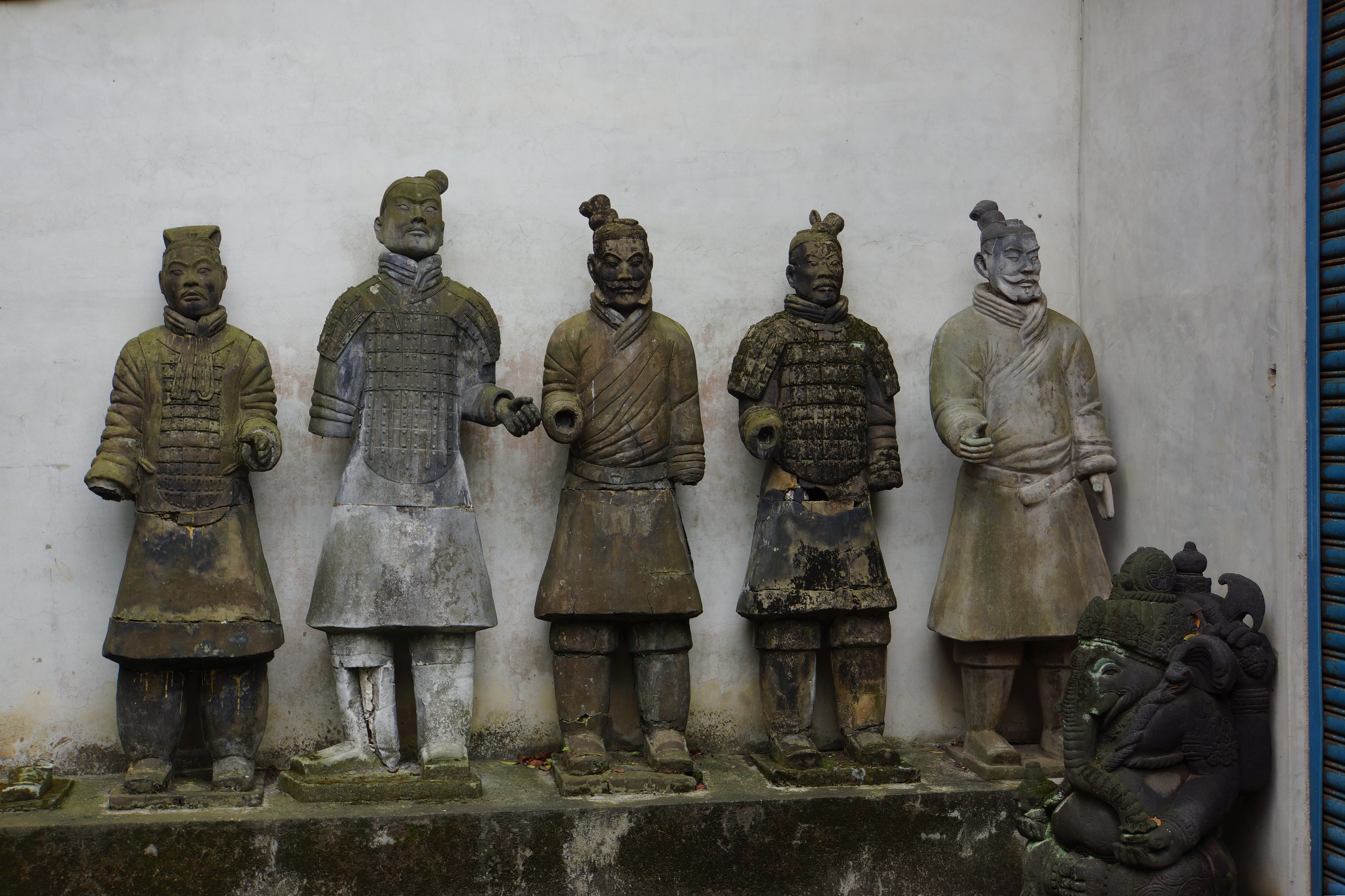
Terracotta warriors wearing kuzhe (some of them wearing their armour over it), Qin dynasty

In Qin dynasty, short clothing became more common and trousers were generally worn from what can be observed from the unearthed Qin dynasty tomb figures.

As a general term for trousers, the ku was worn with jackets ru (襦), also known as shangru (上襦) along with daru (大襦; 'outerwear'). The trousers were often wide at the top and narrower at the bottom and could be find with rise.

Terracotta warriors, for example, wears a type of long robe which is worn on top of skirt and trousers. The Qin artisans valued contrasting colours; for example, the upper garments which were green in colour were often decorated with red or purple border; this upper garment would often be worn together with blue, or purple, or red trousers.

=== Han dynasty ===
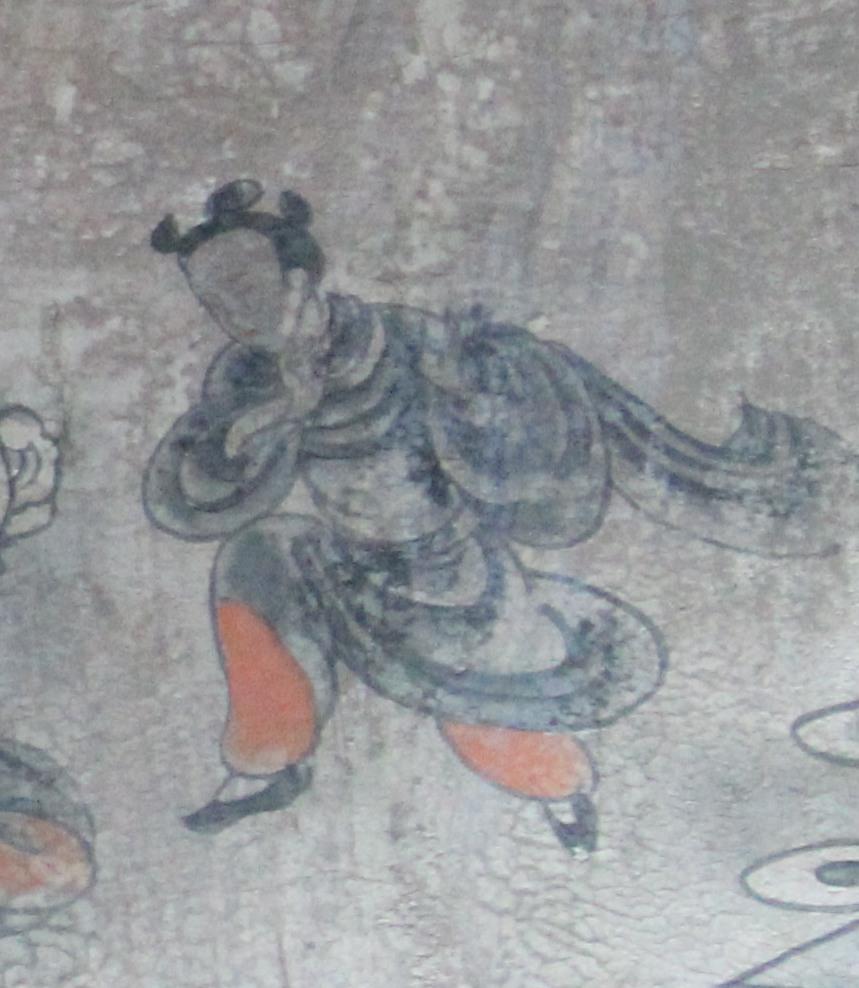
Black zhijupao and red trousers

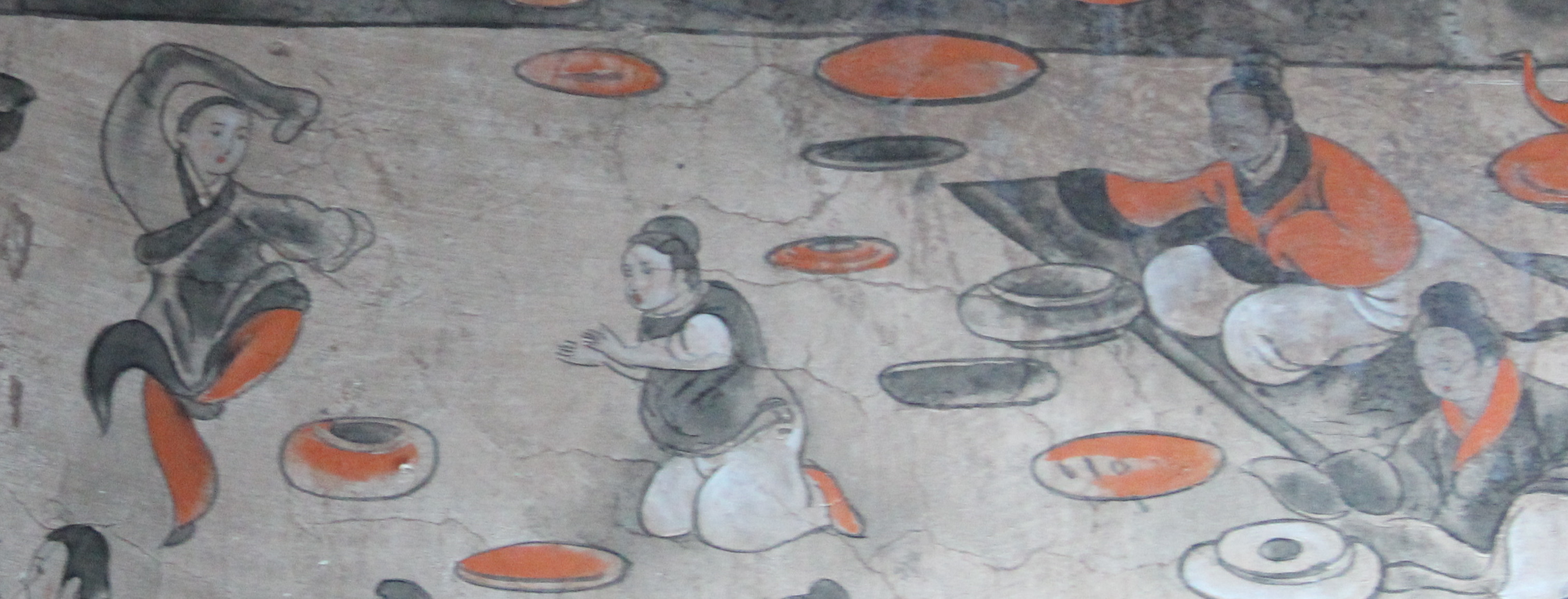
Banquet attendees wearing shanku, Dahuting murals, Eastern Han (1st century AD)

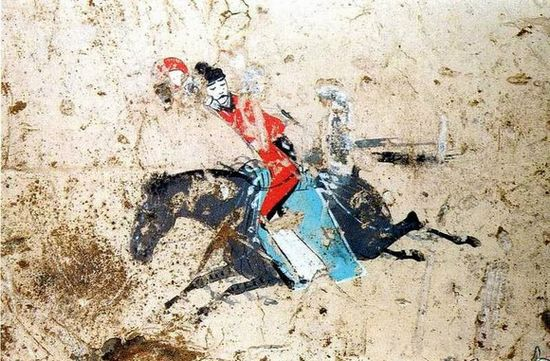
Horseman wearing shanku consisting of a pair of white trousers with red upper garment, Han dynasty tomb mural.

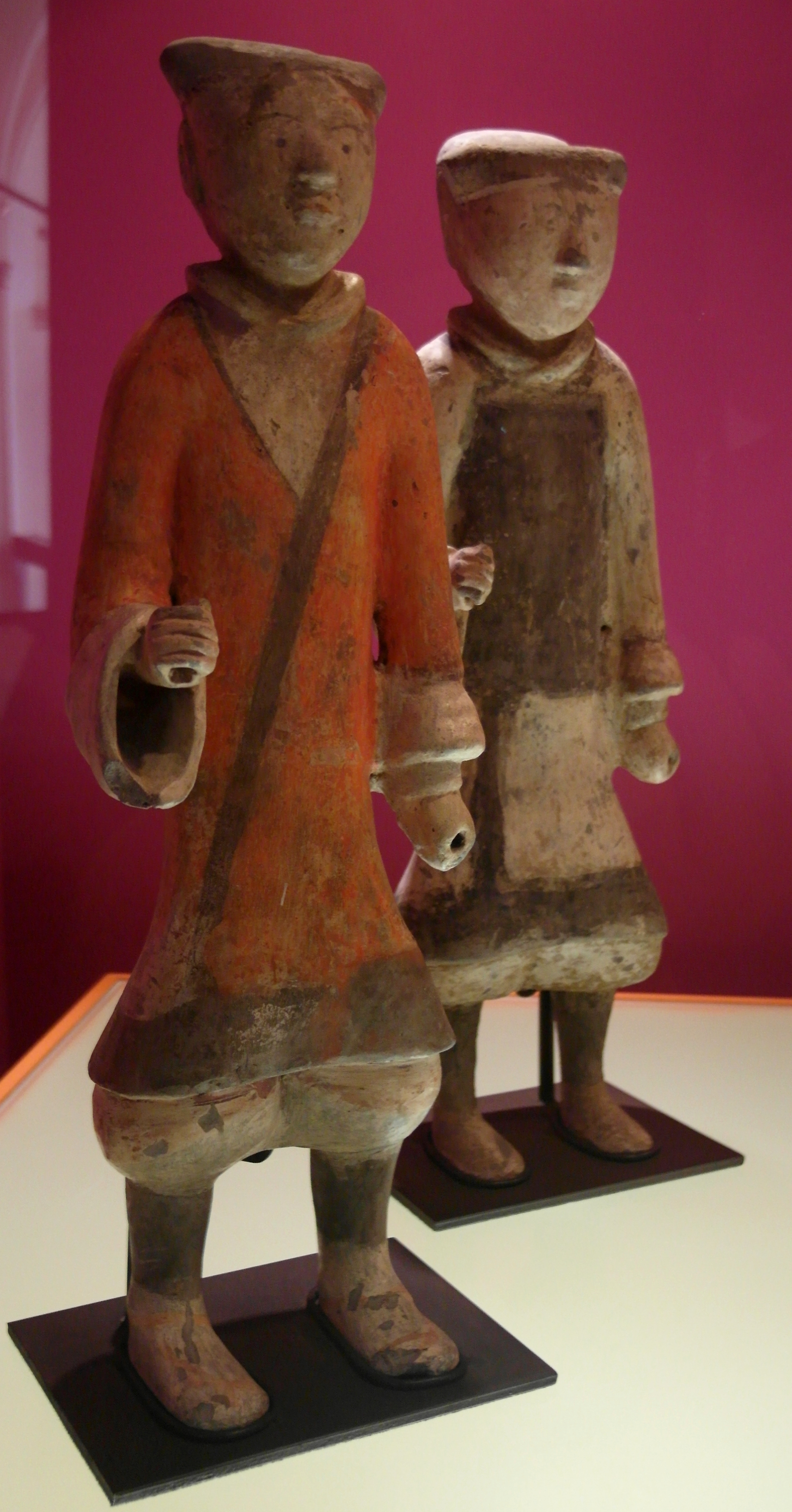
A guard wearing a zhijupao with trousers, Han tomb figurines.

Starting since the Eastern Han dynasty, trousers with rise, kun, gradually started to be worn, the zhijupao of the Han dynasty gradually replaced the qujupao. While the long robe known as shenyi was mainly worn for formal occasions in the Han dynasty, men wore a waist-length ru and trousers in their ordinary days while women wore ruqun. (Note: Authors Feng and Du (2015) specifies that the jacket worn is ru, which is cut to the waist, in this context. They however do not elaborate on the precise type of trousers.) Manual labourers tended to be wear even shorter upper garment and lower garment as due to their convenient use for work.

In the Han dynasty, the kun trousers came in variety of styles, such as dashao and dakouku, while a derivative of the ku-trousers known as qiongku was developed.

The dashao was worn with a loose robe (either shenyi or paofu) in the Han dynasty by both military and civil officials. The dakouku were trousers which were tied with strings under the knees.

The qiongku is a type of kun which covered the hips and legs and its rise and hips regions were closed at the front and multiple strings were used to tie it at the back of its wearer; it was made for palace maids. The qiongku continued to be worn for a long period of time, and was even worn in the Ming dynasty.

=== Wei, Jin, Northern, and Southern dynasties ===
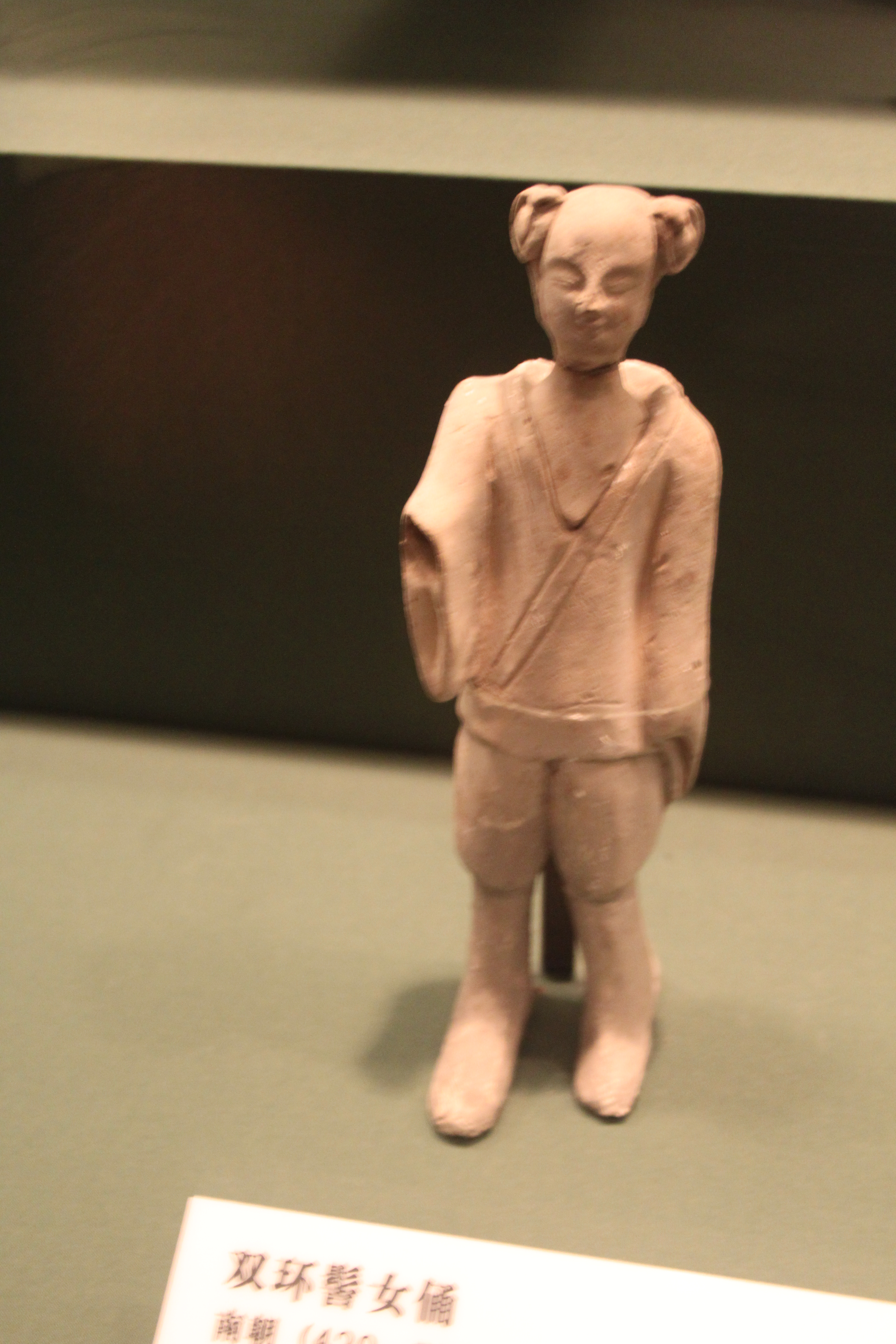
Woman wearing shanku consisting of a dakouku, Southern dynasties

In the early medieval period of China (220–589 AD), male and female commoners, including servants and field labourers, wore a full-sleeved, jiaoling youren long jacket (which were either waist or knee length) which was tied with a belt. Common women could either wear skirts or trousers under their jackets. Full trousers with slightly tempered cuffs or trousers which were tied just below the knees were worn under the jacket. In tombs inventories dating to the early 600s, cases of shanku (衫裤; 衫褲), xiku (褶袴), and kunshan (裈衫) can be found.

The kuzhe or kuxi consisted of the dakouku and a xi, a tight-fitting upper garment, jiaoling youren yi, which reached the knee level. The kuzhe was a popular form of clothing attire and was worn by both genders; it was worn by both military and civil officials in the Northern and Southern dynasties.

The kuzhe which appeared in the late Northern dynasty, was created by assimilating non-Han cultures in order to create a new design which reflected the Han Chinese culture. The dakouku, the style of kun-trousers were bounded at knees and dates back to the Han dynasty, allowed for greater ease of movement; they were also worn in the Western Jin to increase ease of movements when horseback riding or when on military duty. In the Wei, Jin, Northern and Southern dynasties, the dakouku, especially the ones with a wide bottom, became popular among aristocrats and commoners alike. While this style of kun was associated with the Hufu worn by foreigners and non-Chinese minority ethnicities due to the use of felt chords, a textile associated with foreigners; it was actually not a stylistic invention from the Northern people and were not a form of nomad clothing. During this period, the nomadic tribes, which also wore their own Hufu-styles of kuzhe, also ended up being influenced by the Han Chinese style due to the multiculturalism aspect of this period. The xi which was in the form of the yuanlingshan with tight sleeves originated from the Northern minorities was also adopted by the Chinese before being localized and developed Chinese characteristics; the xi was slightly longer than the ru worn by the Chinese and had a yuanling, round collar.

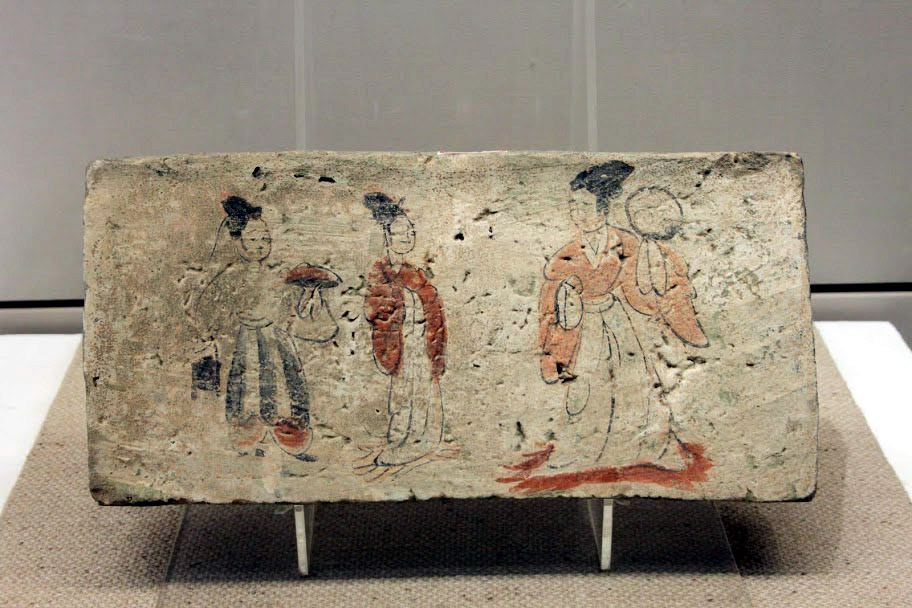
Shanku (left) and ruqun (middle and right), Three Kingdoms period

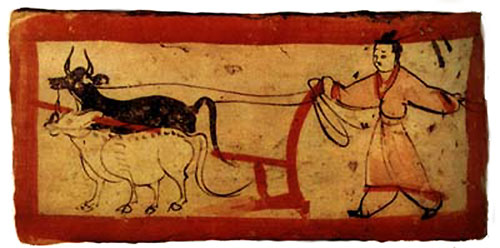
Male commoner wearing a long knee-length jacket and trousers, Western Jin dynasty (265–316 CE)

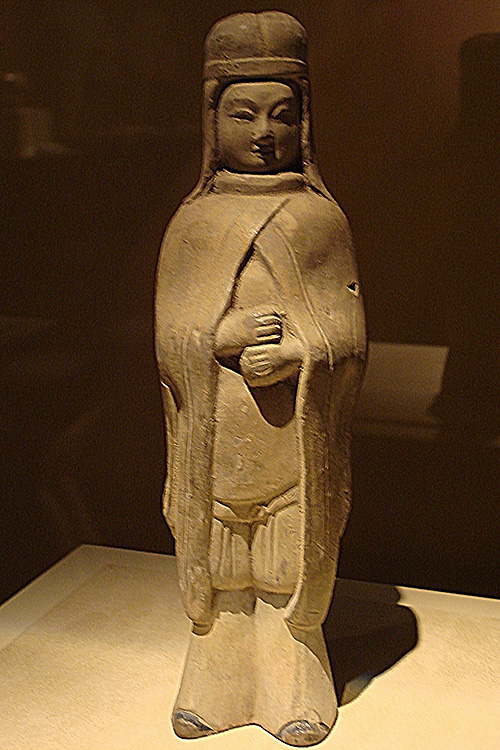
Xianbei female warrior wearing trousers and upper garment

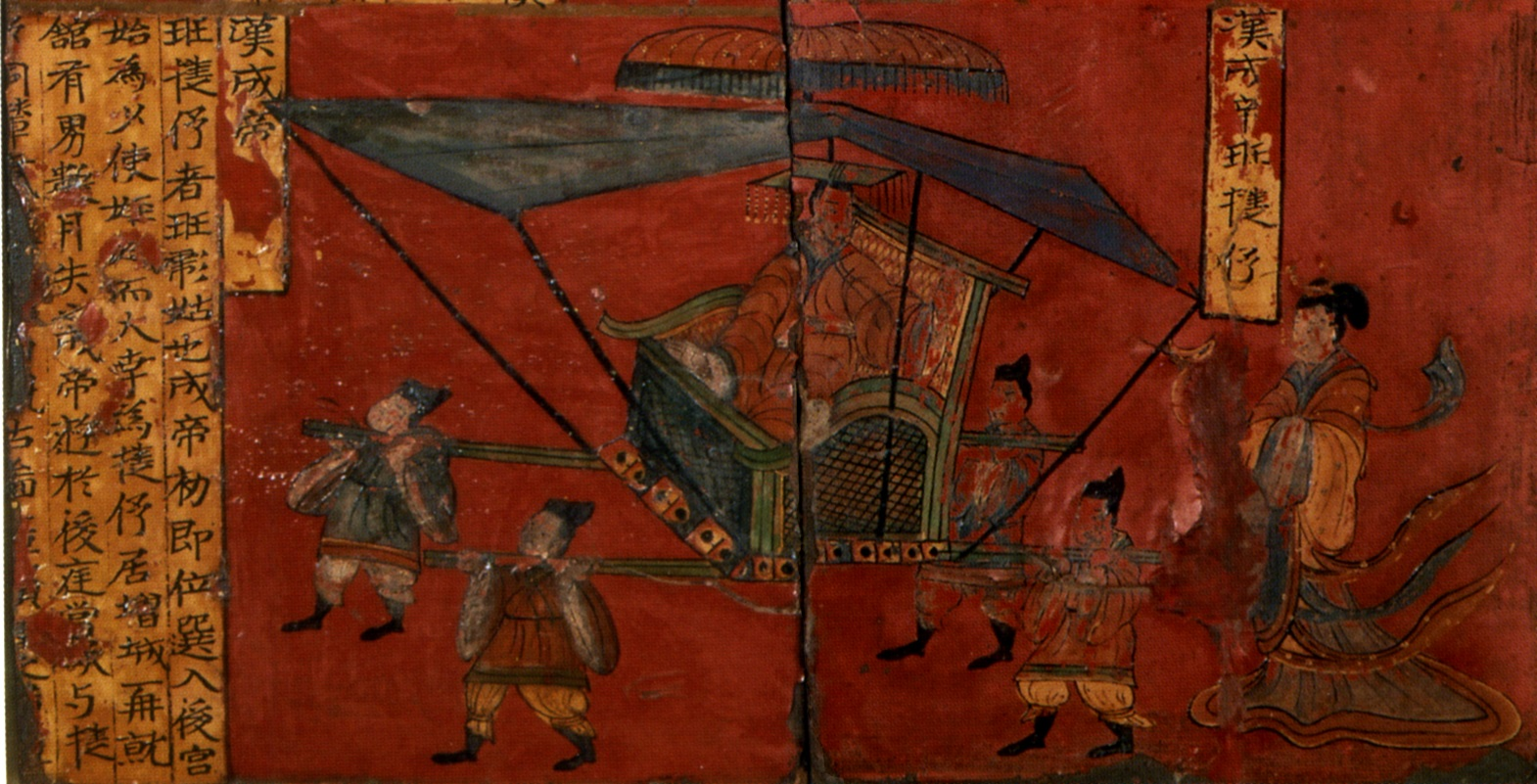
Servants wearing top and trousers while aristocrats wear paofu and guiyi, Northern Wei painting

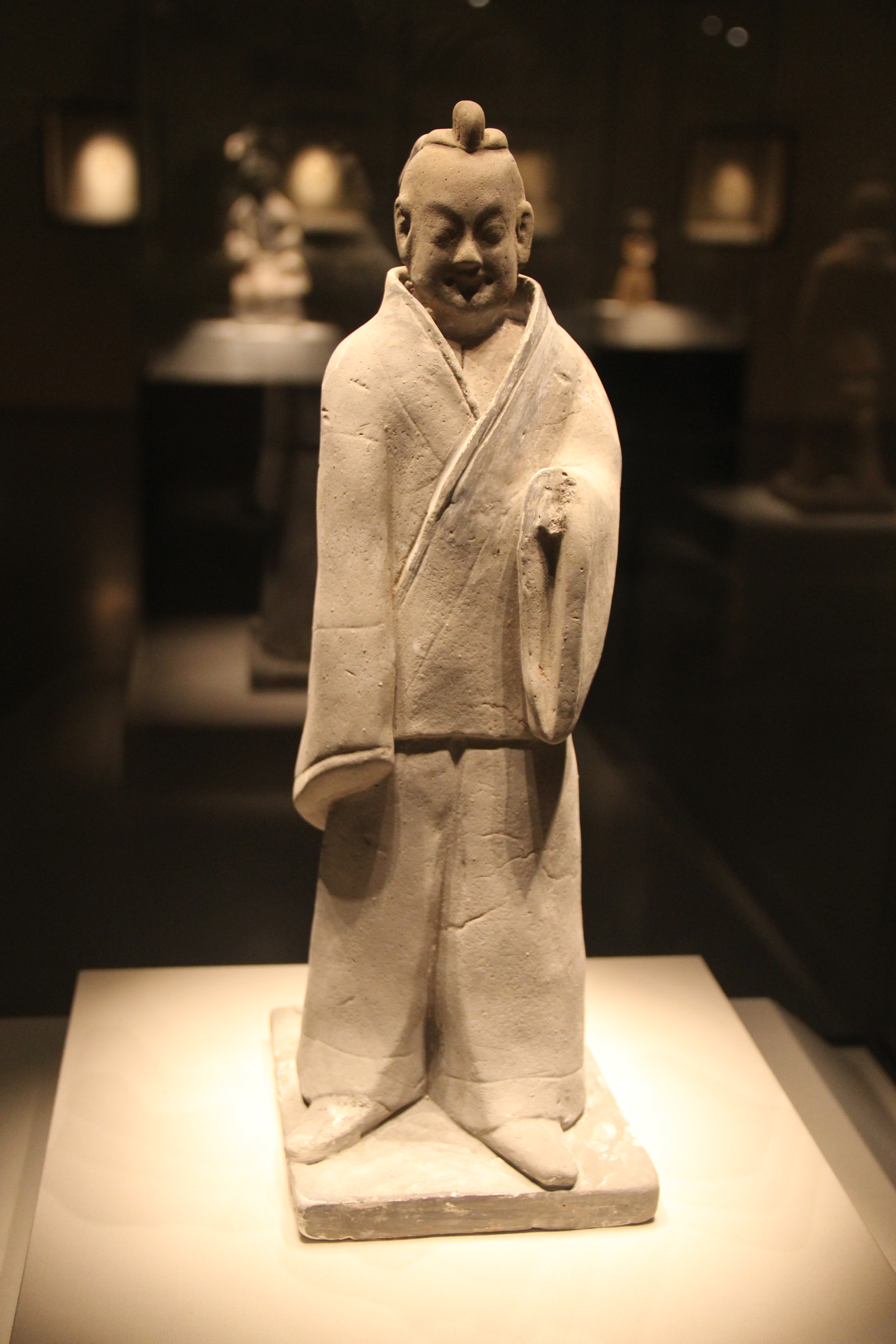
Civil official in shanku, Western Wei

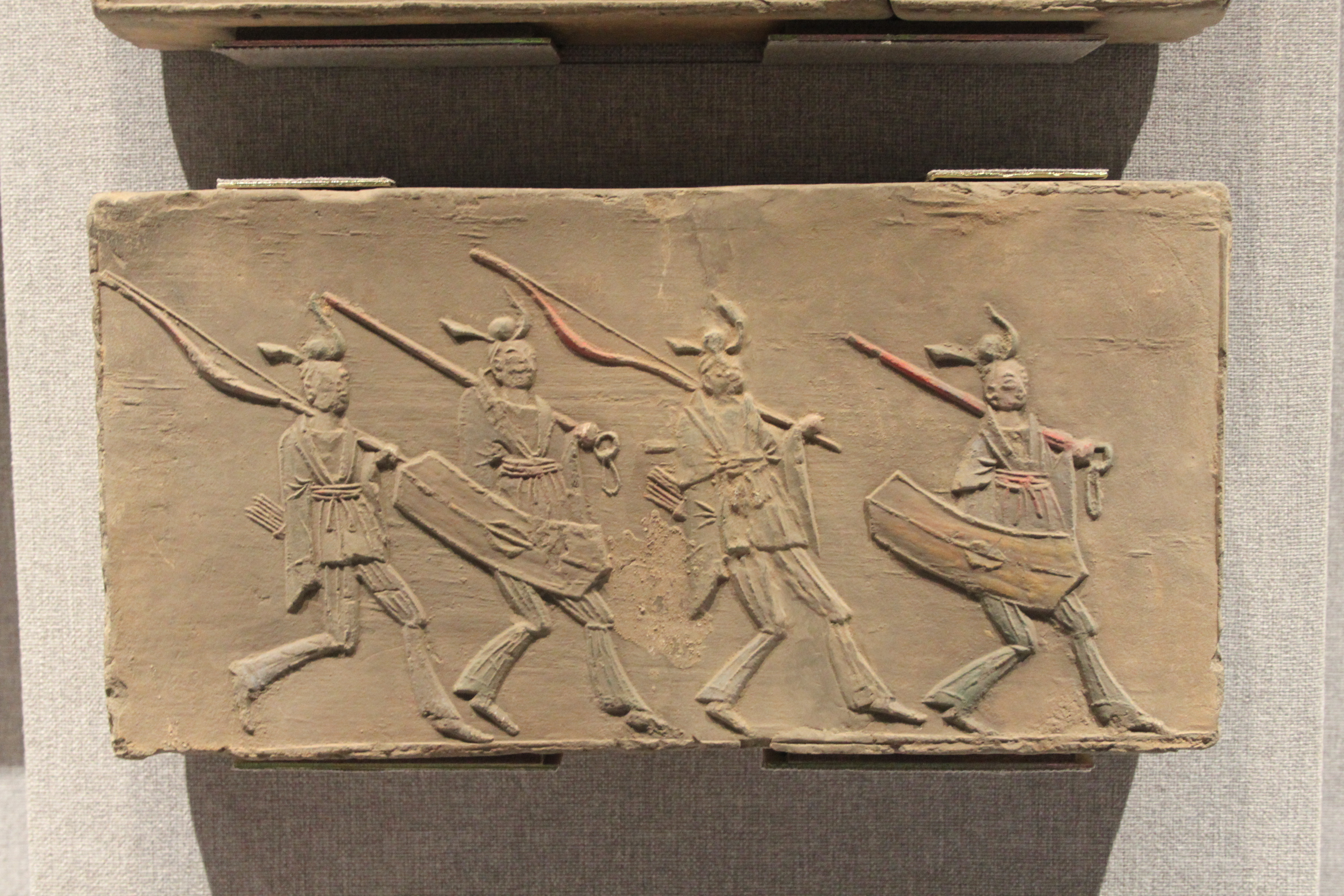
Tomb Brick of Wei, Jin, or Southern-Northern Dynasties

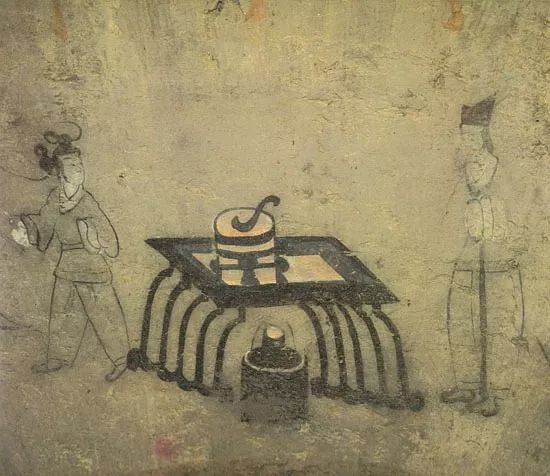
Men wearing shanku. Painting from Yanju's tomb, also known as Jiuquan Dingjia Gate No. 5 Tomb, 5th century AD.

=== Sui to Tang dynasties ===
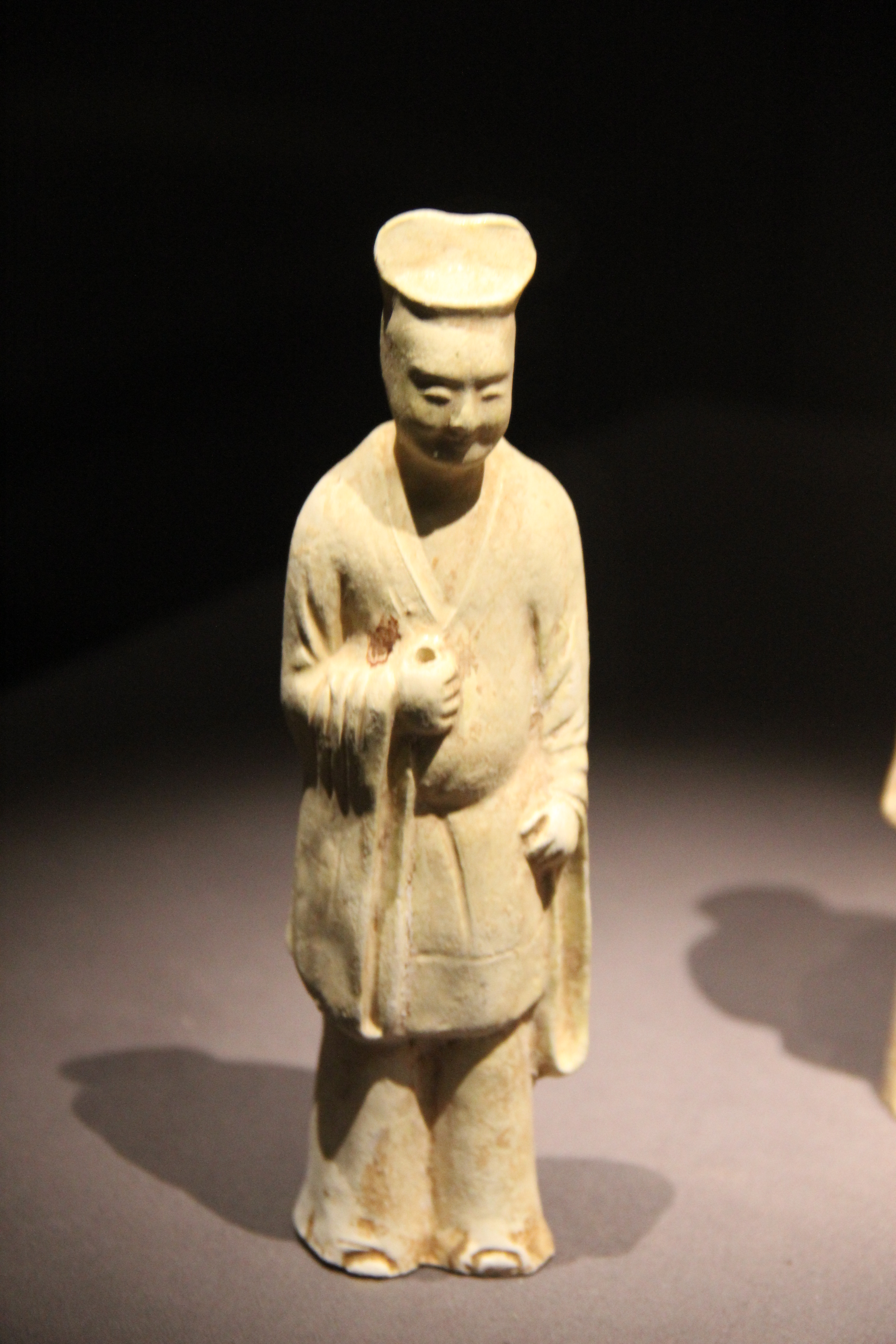
Attendant wearing a shanku, Sui dynasty

In Tang dynasty, the trousers which were worn by men were mainly worn with a form of paofu known as yuanlingpao. However, the kuzhe which had been worn in the previous dynasties remained popular until the Sui and Tang dynasties period.

=== Song to Yuan dynasty ===
In the Song to the Yuan dynasty, the xiaoku, trousers with narrow legs, was worn by the general population during this period.

==== Song dynasty ====
In Song dynasty, labourers who performed heavy tasks preferred to wear short jackets and trousers due to its convenience. In this period, the duanhe worn by poor people were short length clothing and were made out of coarse fabric.

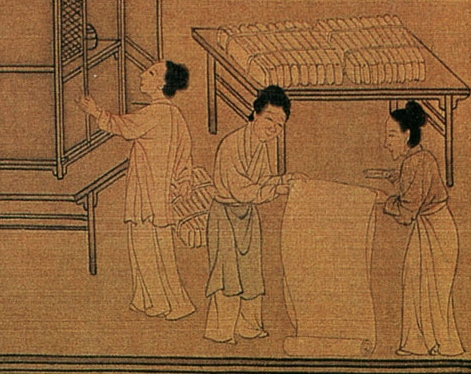
A woman (in the middle) wearing a shanku with an apron; a Song dynasty painting

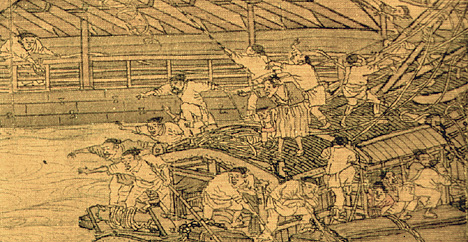
Peasant men wearing shanku, Song dynasty painting

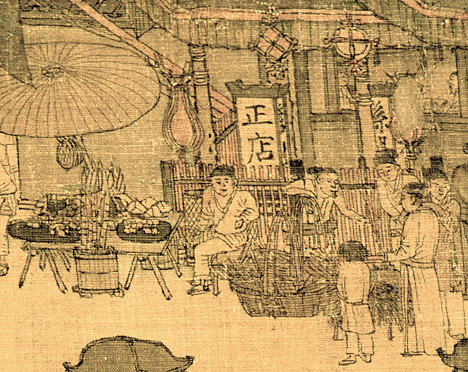
Seller wearing shanku

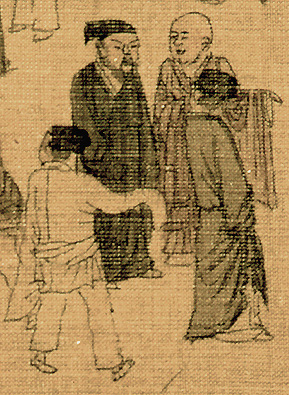
A man wearing shanku vs men wearing paofu

==== Yuan dynasty ====
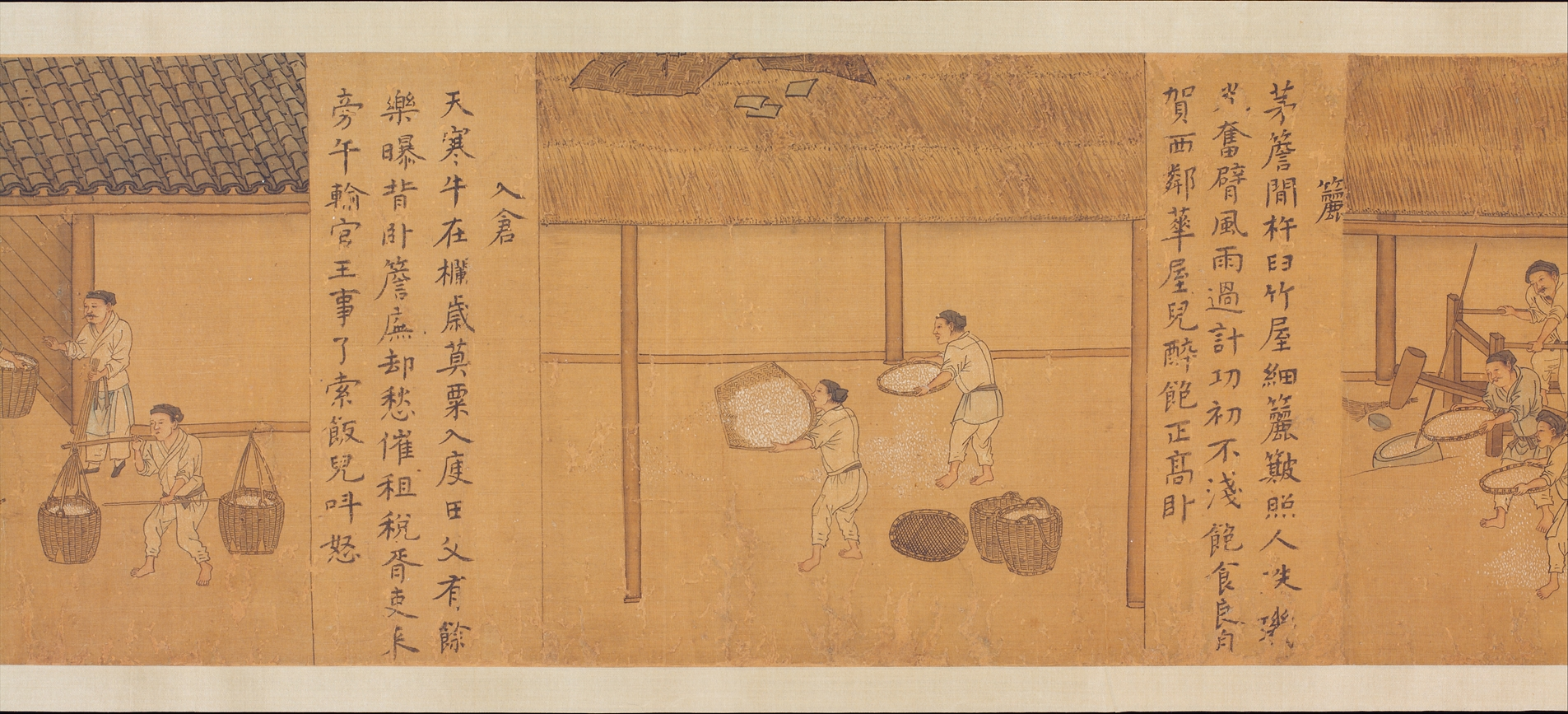
Shanku worn by farming man, Yuan dynasty

In Yuan dynasty, some scholars and commoners wore the terlig, a Mongol-style kuzhe, which was braided at the waists and had pleats and narrow-fitting sleeves.

=== Ming dynasty ===
In Ming dynasty, the trousers with open-rise and close-rise were worn by men and women. Women in Ming continued to wear trousers under their skirts.

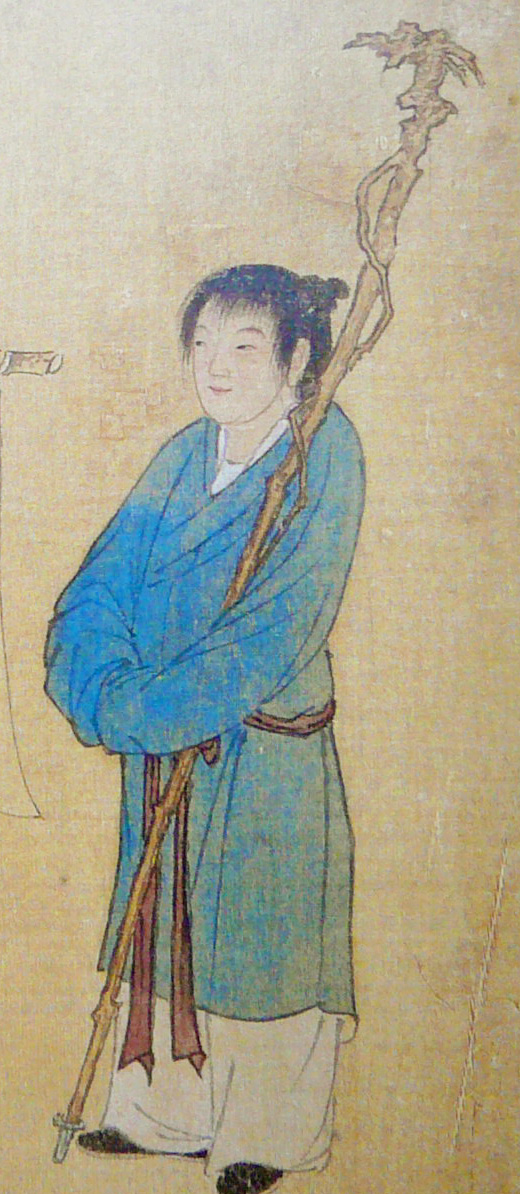
Ming dynasty portrait of a person wearing white trousers and blue top

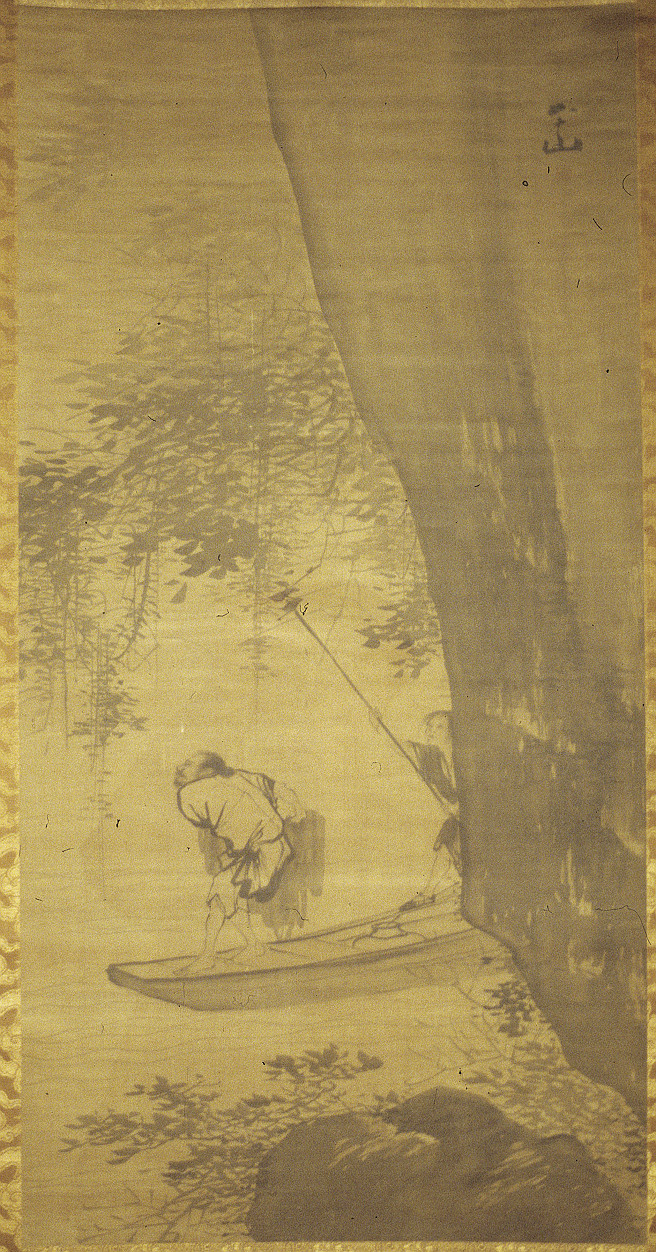
Fisherman, Ming dynasty painting

==== Appearance of standing collars ====
In the late Ming dynasty, jackets with high collars started to appear. The standup collar were closed with interlocking buttons made of gold and silver, called zimukou (子母扣). The appearance of interlocking buckle promoted the emergence and the popularity of the standup collar and the Chinese jacket with buttons at the front, and laid the foundation of the use of Chinese knot buckles. In women garments of the Ming dynasty, the standup collar with gold and silver interlocking buckles became one of the most distinctive and popular form of clothing structure; it became commonly used in women's clothing reflecting the conservative concept of Ming women's chastity by keeping their bodies covered and due to the climate changes during the Ming dynasty (i.e. the average temperature was low in China).

=== Qing dynasty – 19th century ===
The high collar jacket continued to be worn in Qing dynasty, but it was not a common feature until the 20th century. In the late Qing, the high collar become more popular and was integrated to the jacket and robe of the Chinese and the Manchu becoming a regular garment feature instead of an occasional feature. For the Han Chinese women, the stand-up collar became a defining feature of their long jacket; this long jacket with high collar could be worn over their trousers but also over their skirts (i.e. aoqun). The high collar remained a defining feature of their jacket even in the first few years of the republic.

In Qing dynasty, Han Chinese women who wore shanku without wearing a skirt on top of their trousers were typically people born from the lower social class. Otherwise, they would wear trousers under their skirts which is in accordance with the traditions since the Han dynasty. In Mesny's Chinese Miscellany written in 1897 by William Mesny, it was however observed that skirts were worn by Chinese women over their trousers in some regions of China, but that in most areas, skirts were only used when women would go out for paying visits. He also observed that the wearing of trousers was a national custom for Chinese women and that trousers were worn in their homes when they would do house chores; he observed that women were dressed almost like men when working at home, except that their trousers had trims at the bottom of different coloured materials.

In the 19th century, the shan was long in length and the trousers ku was wide. In the late 19th century, men stopped wearing the shan which closes to the right and started wearing a jacket with a central-opening which looks similar to the Tangzhuang.

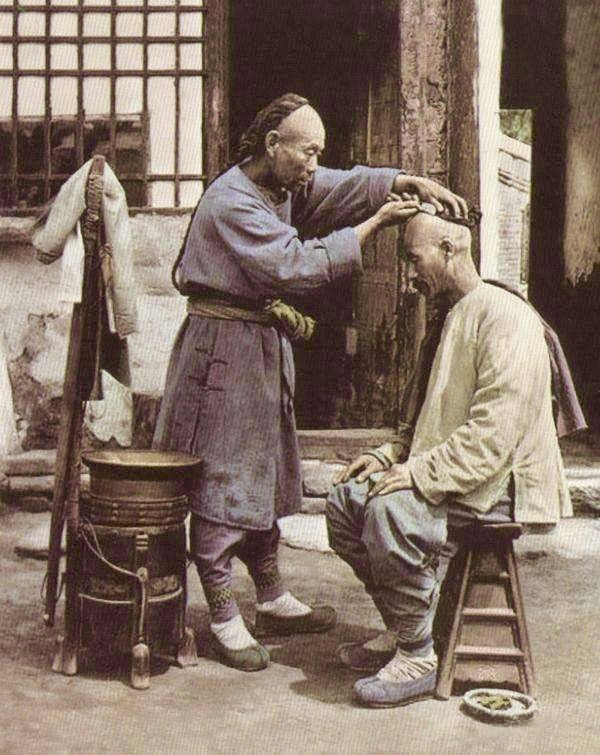
Qing dynasty men wearing shanku, before 1912 AD

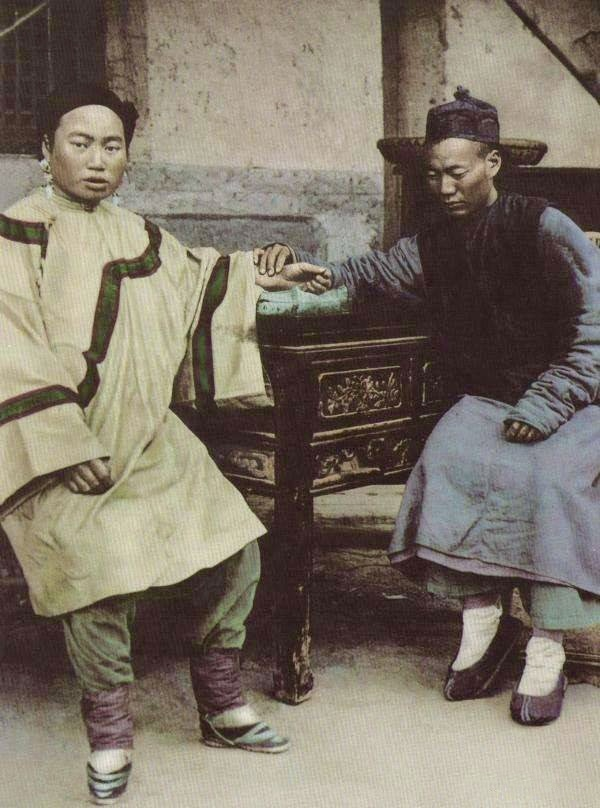
A woman wearing a white shan/ao and dark coloured ku

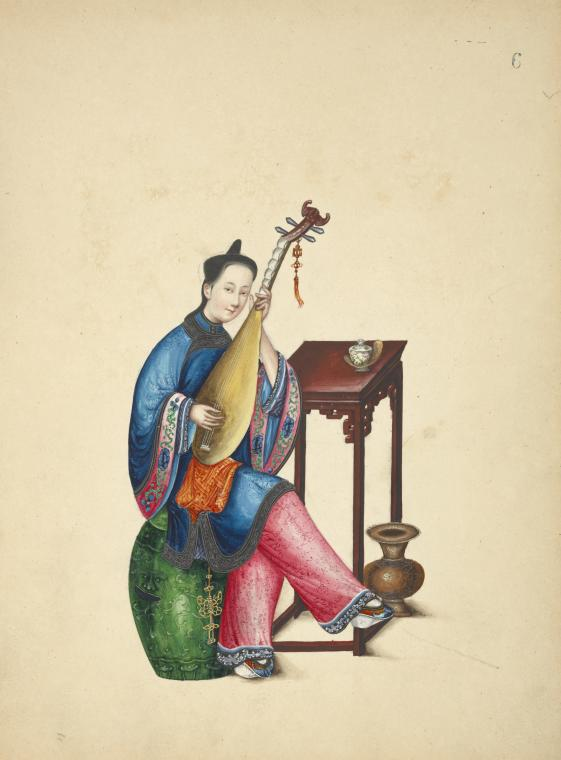
Woman wearing a blue ao/shan and pink trousers

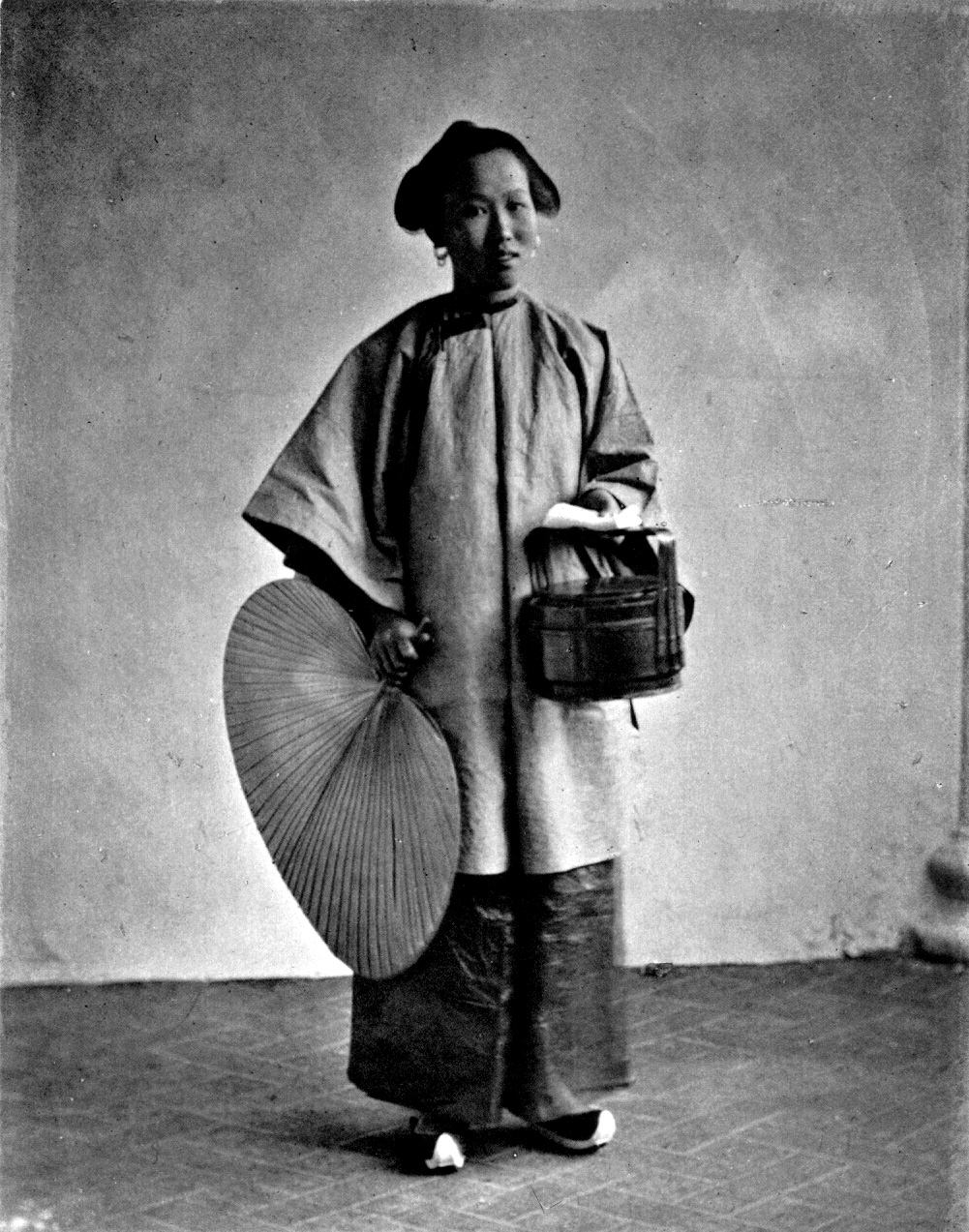
A lady's maid

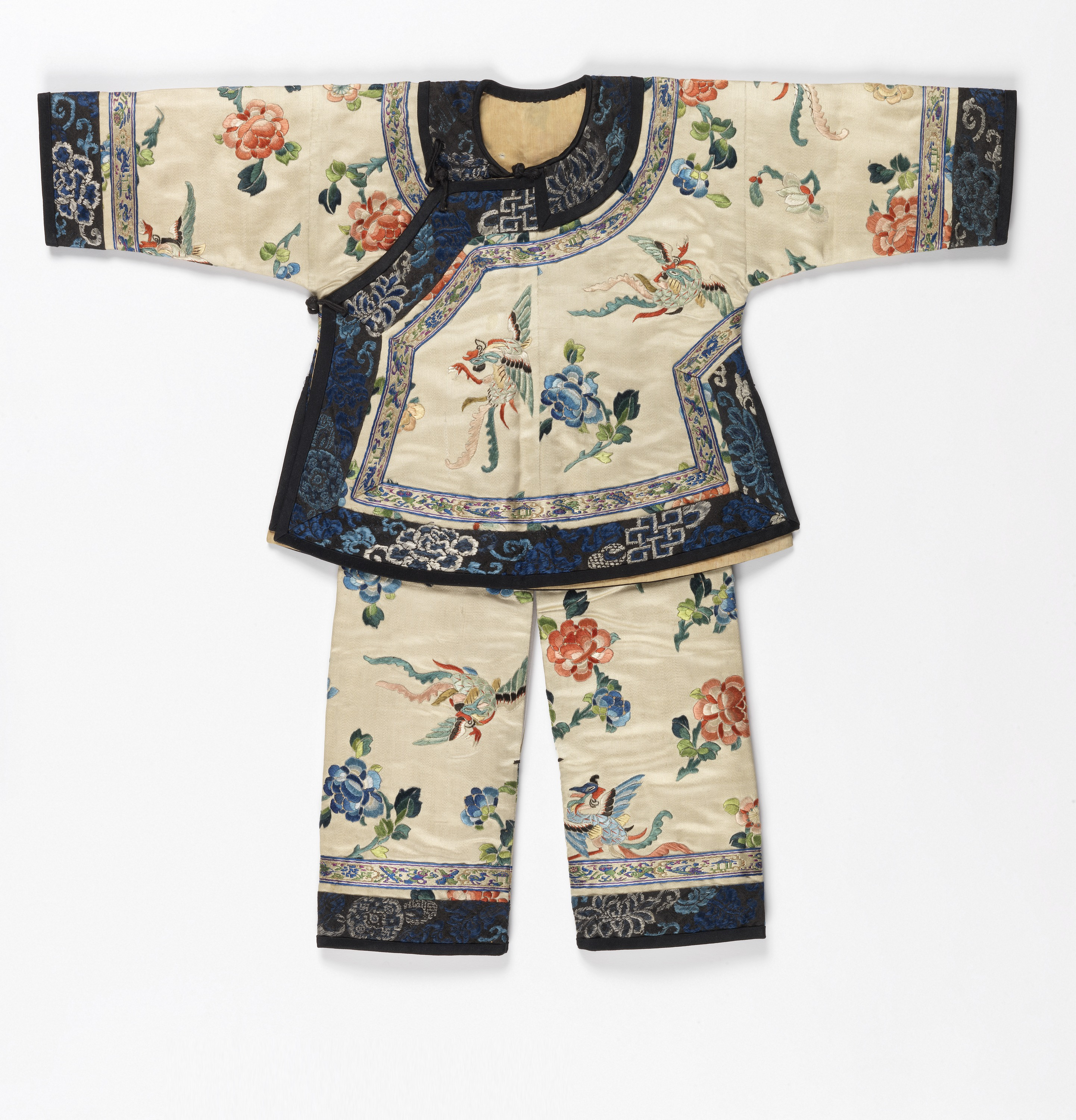
Shanku outfit, late 19th century

=== 20th century ===
In the 20th century, the 19th-century long shan gradually became shorter and become more fitted. The neckband of the shan was also narrow. Sleeveless and short-sleeved shanku also existed in the 20th century.

In the 1950s, women of lower status and those worked on farms would sometimes wear shanku which was decorated with floral patterns and checks. People living in urban areas started to wear Western clothing while people in rural areas continued to wear shanku. In Hong Kong, shanku continued to be worn when people were away from their workplace.

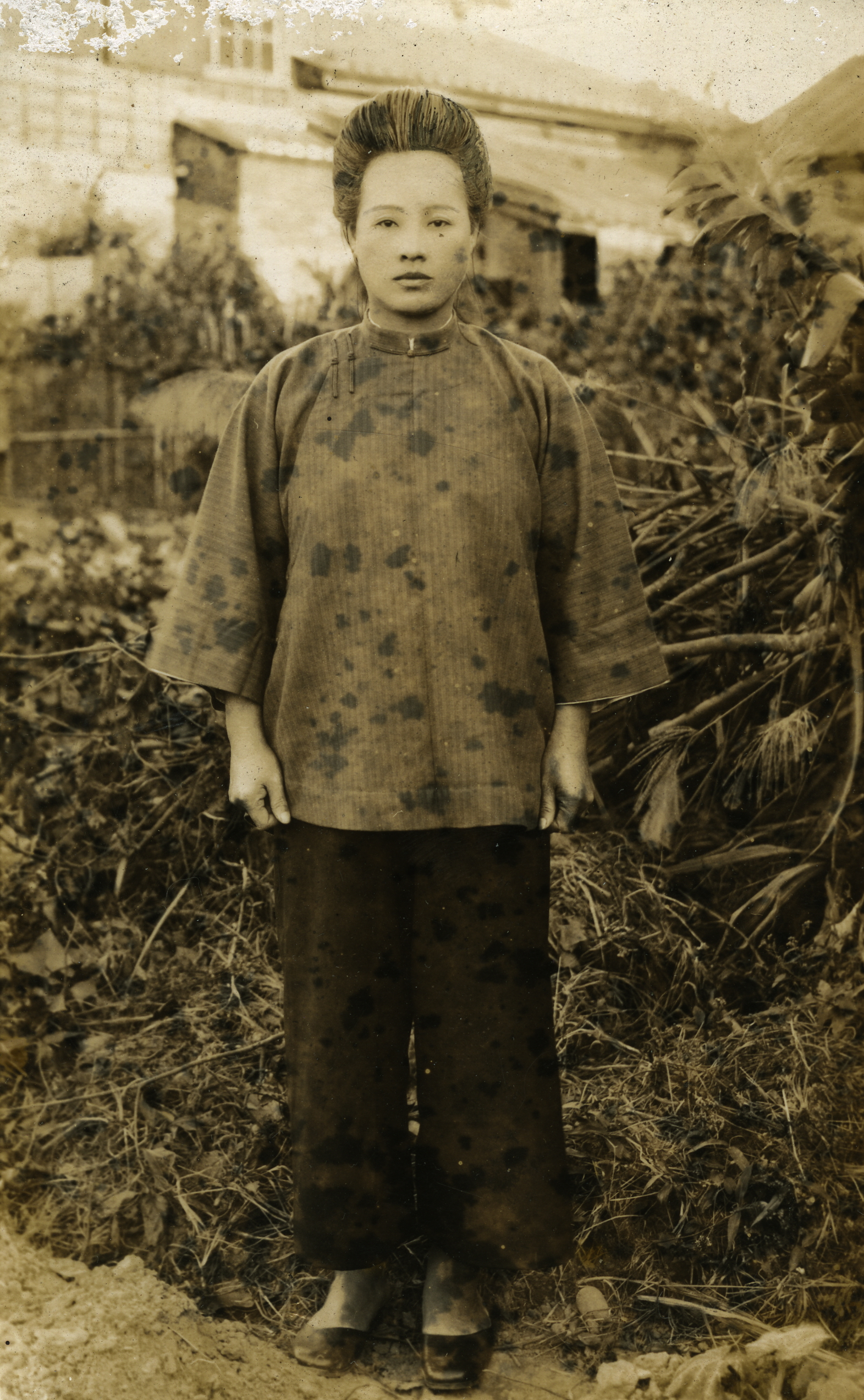
Hakka woman wearing shanku, between 1935 and 1945

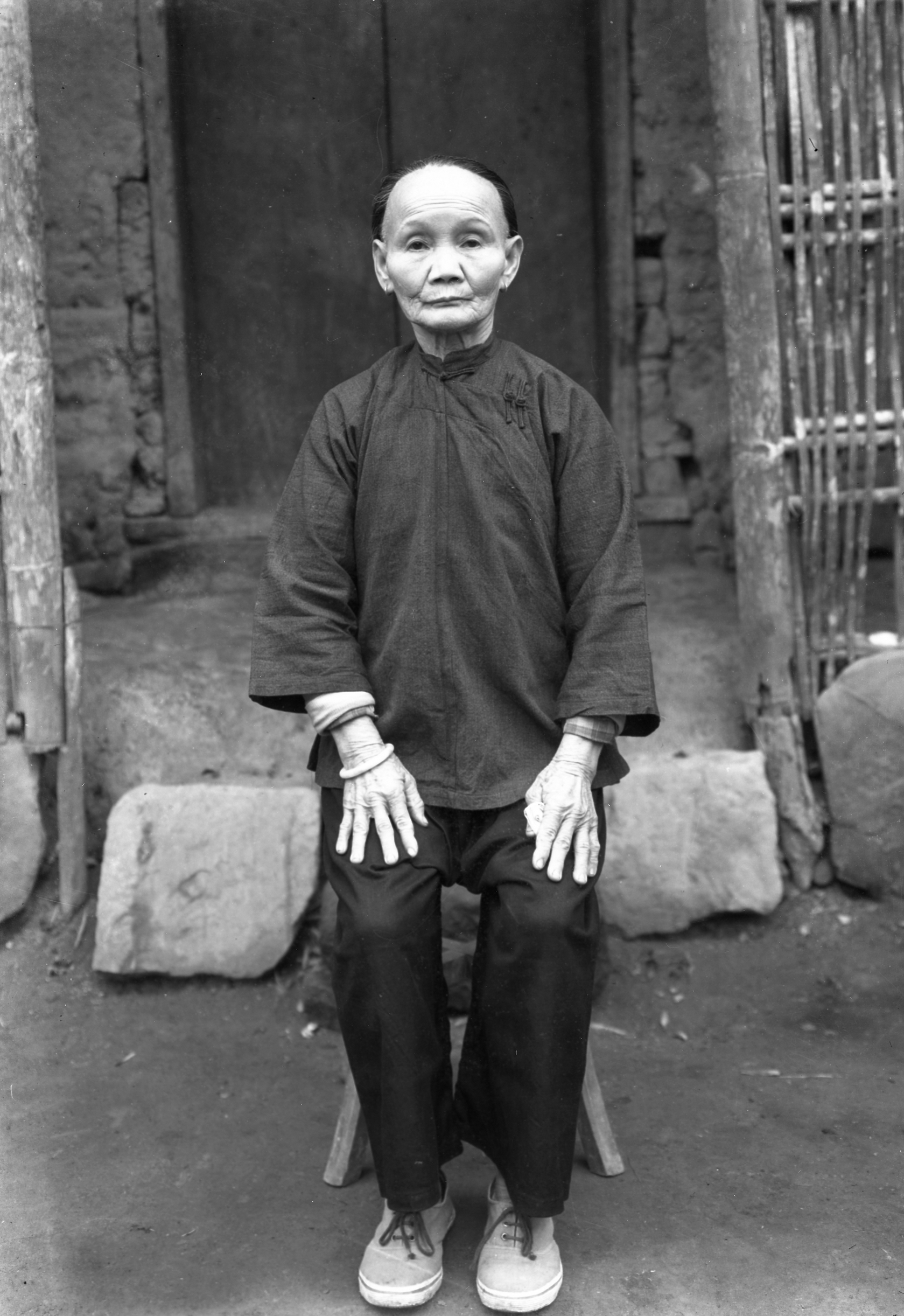
Hakka woman in shanku, 1950

During the Great Leap Forward, the Mao suit became popular. but it was not expected for children to wear the Mao suit. While in cities, children started to wear Western style clothing, the children in the rural areas continued to wear the traditional shanku which were made of cotton checked fabrics, stripe fabrics, or other patterned fabrics.

== Ethnic clothing ==
=== Han Chinese ===
Both Han Chinese women and men of the labouring classes wore shanku. The trousers, which could be found either narrow or wide, were a form of standard clothing for the Han Chinese.

==== Hakka ====
The Hakka people wears shanku as their traditional clothing; both Hakka men and women wear it. The preferred colours of the Hakka shanku is typically blue and black.

==== Hoklo ====
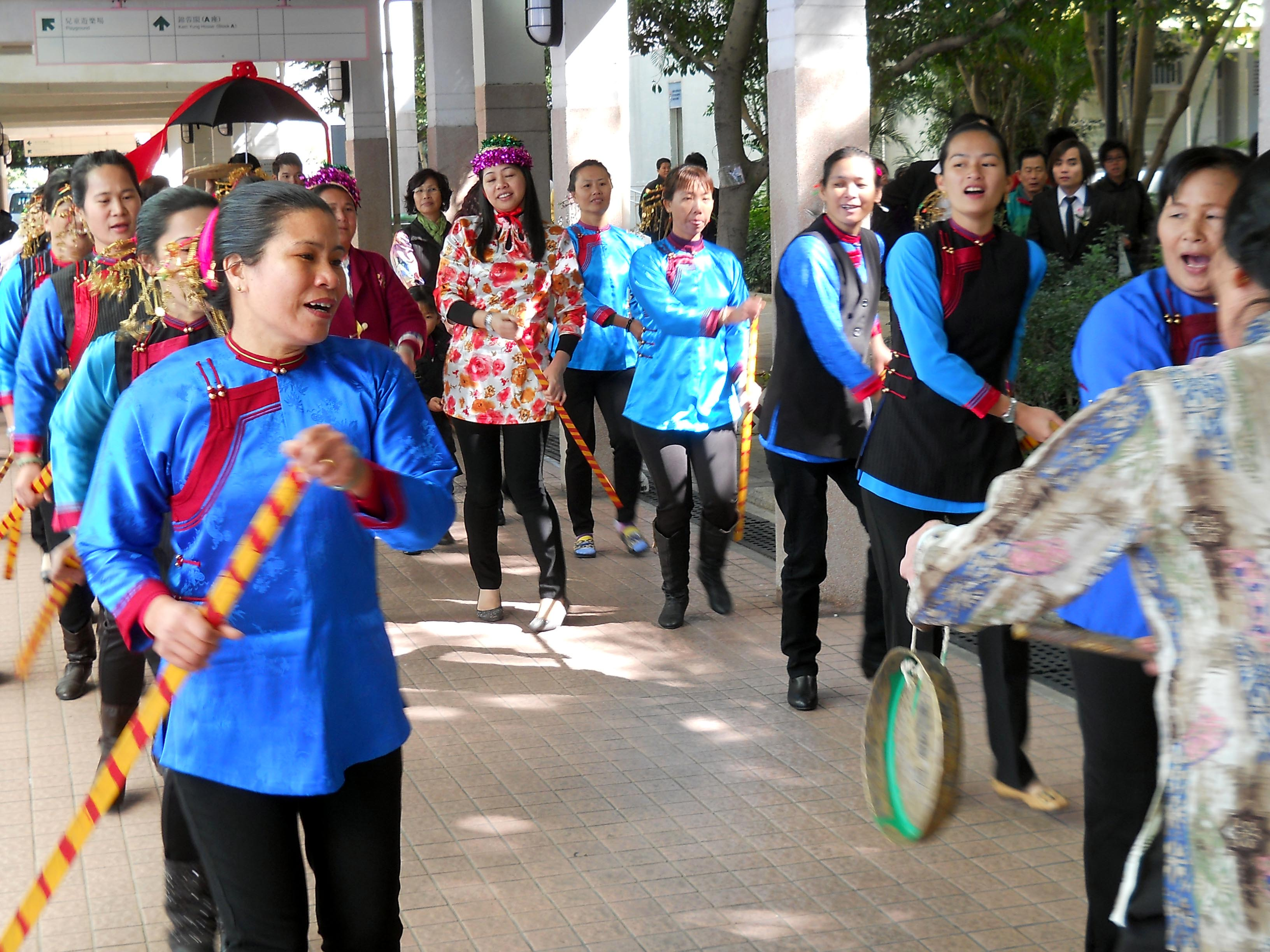
Hoklo women wearing shanku

The Hoklo people wears shanku which is composed of fitted-style of shan which has a deeply curved hem and black-coloured trousers ku. Their shan was characterized by the bands decoration at the sleeves edges and at the garment opening as well as the collar of the shan which was very narrow and also consisted of piping rows. They typically wore bright colours such as light blue as every day wear while colours such as purple, deep blue, deep turquoise were reserved for special occasions.

==== Tanka ====
The Tanka people also wear shanku which is distinctive in style wherein the shan and the ku matched in colour; they prefer wearing colours which are lighter and brighter, such as pale green, pale blue, turquoise, yellow and pink. These lighter colours tended to be preferred by younger women or by newly married women; they were also worn on special occasions. On the other hand, darker colours were favoured by older women.

== Influences and derivatives ==
=== Vietnam ===
In the 15th century (from 1407 to 1478), the Vietnamese women adopted Chinese trousers under the occupation of the Ming dynasty. During the 17th and 18th century, Vietnam was divided in two regions with the Nguyen lords ruling the South. The Nguyen lords ordered that southern men and women had to wear Chinese-stye trousers and long front-buttoning tunics to differentiate themselves from the people living in the North. This form of outfit developed with time over the next century becoming the precursor of the áo dài, the outfit generally consisted of trousers, loose-fitting shirt with a stand-up collar and a diagonal right side closure which run from the neck to the armpit; these features were inspired by the Chinese and the Manchu clothing.

In the pre-20th century, Vietnamese people of both sexes continue to maintain old Ming-style of Chinese clothing consisting of a long and loose knee-length tunics and ankle-length, loose trousers. In the 1920s, the form ensemble outfit was refitted to become the Vietnamese national dress, the ladies' áo dài.

== See also ==
- Ru – a type of Chinese upper garment
- Hufu – non-Han Chinese clothing
- Tangzhuang
- Hanfu
- Ruqun
- Hakka people
