= Ku (trousers) =

Traditional Chinese trousers

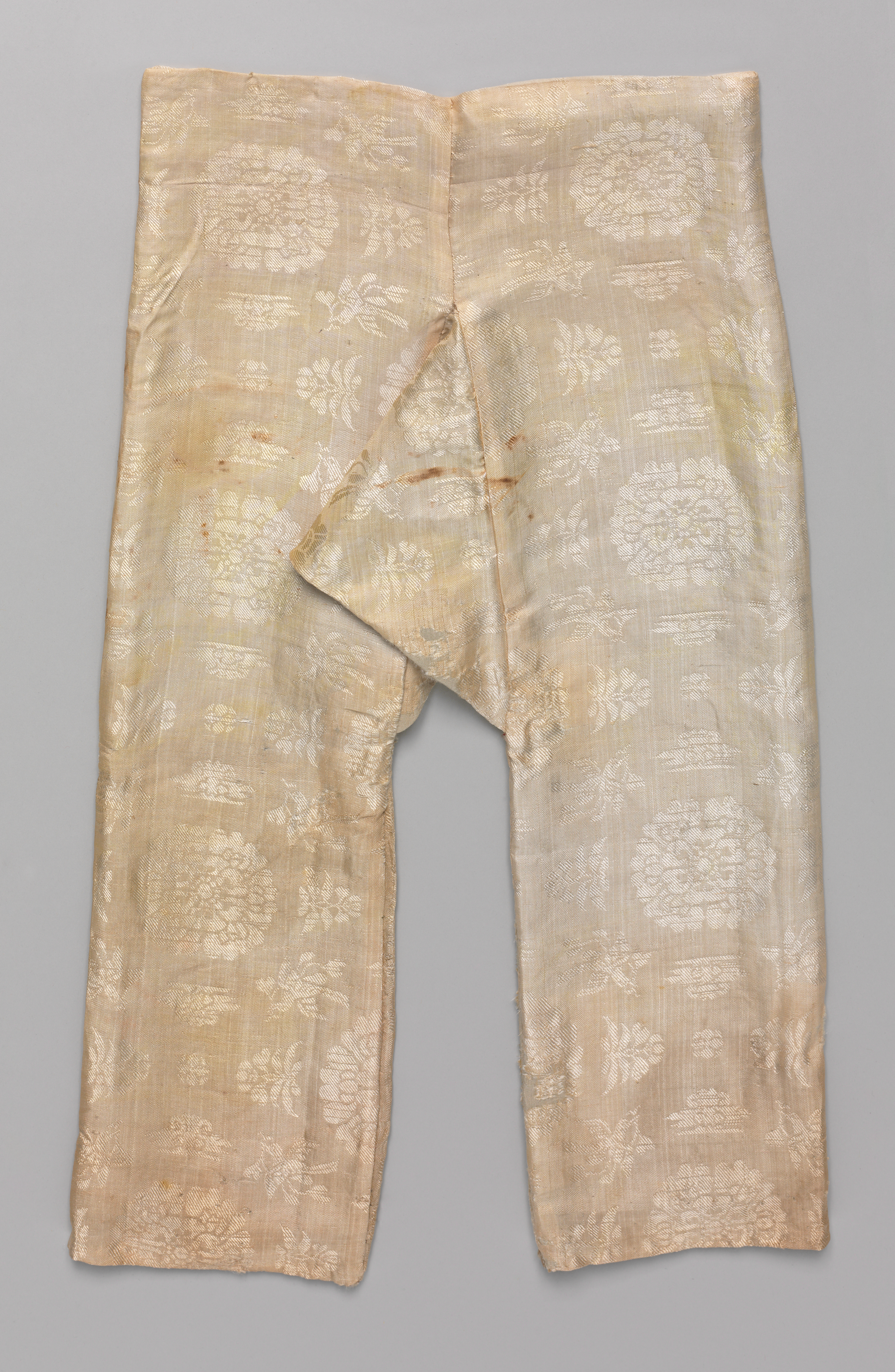
- A ku worn by a small boy, likely worn by a member of the imperial family or nobility, Tang dynasty

Chinese name
- Traditional Chinese: 褲
- Simplified Chinese: 裤
- Literal meaning: Trousers/ pants
Transcriptions
Standard Mandarin
- Hanyu Pinyin: Kù
- Bopomofo: ㄎㄨˋ
Hakka
- Pha̍k-fa-sṳ: fu
Yue: Cantonese
- Jyutping: fu3

English name
- English: Trousers

Ku (Chinese: 褲; lit. 'trousers') or kuzi (Chinese: 褲子; lit. 'trousers/pants'), collectively refers to the traditional Chinese trousers in Hanfu in the broad sense. Ku can also refer to the kaidangku (Chinese: 開襠褲; pinyin: kāidāngkù; lit. 'Open crotch trousers'), (Note: Not to be confused with the modern-style kaidangku which is worn by toddlers in present-days.) which are Chinese trousers without a rise as opposed to the trousers with a rise, referred as hédāngkù (合襠褲; 'crotch trousers') or kūn (褌; 'breeches/drawers') in ancient times. (Note: The trousers with crotch can also be called mandangku (缦裆裤), mangdangku (满裆裤), mingdanku (抿裆裤))

The upper garment yi, the ku which evolved from the jingyi which existed since the Neolithic period, and the chang (裳; 'skirt') from which the qun (裙; 'skirt') eventually evolved from, are indigenous to Central area of China. When the ku is combined with the yi upper garment and the chang, the complete attire in the Hanfu-system is formed. The ku is worn as a lower garment in a set of attire known as shanku and/or sometimes be worn under the skirt of the ruqun. With time, the Chinese trousers evolved and changed in a variety of shapes and styles. The adoption of the hedangku used in the Hufu of Northern nomadic people through the adoption of the Hufuqishe policy by King Wuling of Zhao during the Warring States period eventually made the hedangku-style trousers popular among the ancestors of the Han Chinese and the Chinese ethnic minorities in the South. The Hufu-style hedangku influenced the development of both the ku and kun of the Han Chinese and the hedangku of the other ethnic minorities of China leading to the creation and development of more innovative styles of trousers with time. There are many different styles and shapes of hedangku which differ based on the ethnic groups of China; the shape and form of the rise structure in the hedangku also vary depending on different ethnic minorities.

== Terminology ==
As a general term, the term kuzi (褲子) and ku (褲; 'trousers') can both be literally translated as "trousers or pants" in English language. The Chinese character for ku (褲) has other character variants such as (袴) and (絝). The character ku (絝) is the archaic form of character of ku (袴). The term 短褲 ('duǎnkù') refers to shorts.

=== Hedangku/ kun ===
The hedangku were referred as kūn (褌; 'breeches/drawers')) in the Warring States period. In a Qin dynasty manuscript called Zhiyi (制衣; 'Making Clothes'), however, Chinese trousers, including hedangku, are recorded as kù (絝)

Styles of hedangku
Name	English name	Description	Period	Images
Dashao (大袑)		A trousers with extremely wide and loose legs in the Han-style to make them look harmonious with the paofu. It was worn by civil and military officials.	Han	
Dakouku (大口褲) / fu		A type of trousers with loose legs, which were tied with strings under the knee in the Han dynasty and became a prevalent form of trousers in the Wei, Jin, Northern and Southern dynasties. The strings were tied around the knees to prevent its wearer from getting caught by something while walking.	Han – Tang	
Dubikun (犢鼻褌; 'calf-nose trousers'))	Calf-nose pants/ calf-nose shorts	It was used as an under-trousers. In terms of appearance: it was a form of short trousers in length, which was cut in the shape of a calf-nose, thus gaining its name.	Han	
Zhangshikun (長式褌))		A form of long trousers.		

=== Kaidangku/ ku ===
The jingyi (脛衣; 'shin clothing'), as the earliest form of trousers consisting of two separate legs for each leg, also became known as kù (絝), qian (褰), duo (襗), and taoku (套袴) through different period of time.

In the Shang dynasty, the term chang (裳; 'lower garments') could be used as a general term to refer to both the ku and the skirt called chang (裳; 'skirt'). In the Spring and Autumn period and Han dynasty, trousers without crotches were called kù (絝). The term ku (袴) can also be found in the ancient texts, such as in the Western Han dynasty text called Fang Yan (方言) by Yang Xiong, and in the chapter Xiaoerya (小爾雅) of the kongcongzi (孔叢子) dating from the Eastern Han to Three Kingdoms period. According to the Fang Yan, the ku (袴), which was in Guangxi, was also called 䙭 or 襱 in Qilu (齊魯).

Styles of kaidangku
Name	English name	Description	Period	Images
Jingyi (脛衣))		The earliest form of ku in China; made up of two legs which cover the shank only (i.e. from the knees to the ankles); when worn, it was directly worn on the shank. It came in pairs like shoes.	Neolithic to Han	
Kaidangku (開襠褲))	Open-crotch pants/ open-crotch trousers/ split pants	A trousers worn by toddlers in China.		
Qiongku (窮絝))		A trousers with an upper part covering the hip and with the lower part which covers the lower legs; the rise and hips are closed at the front and multiple strings are used to tie it at the back.	Western Han – Ming	
Taoku (套袴))		A jingyi-style ku which evolved from the Song dynasty's xiku in the Ming dynasty; it was worn over other forms of trousers. In the Qing dynasty, the taoku covered both the thighs and the legs	Ming – Qing	
Waku (襪褲))/ kuwa (褲襪))		A style of xiku which was forbidden in the Song dynasty to be worn by women except if the wearer was an actress performing in drama theatre.		
Xiku (膝褲))		A jingyi-style ku which first appeared in the Song dynasty and later became prevalent in the Ming dynasty. When worn, it was used on top of another form of trousers, which marks its difference from the jingyi of the ancient times. It eventually evolved into the taoku in the Ming dynasty.	Song – Ming	

== History ==
=== Pre-Warring States period ===
The ku was worn in China since the neolithic times, where it was called jingyi (胫衣; 脛衣; 'shin clothing')). The jingyi was the earliest form of in China and only covered the shank of its wearer. The jingyi consisted of two separated legs which were tied on calves and allowed to exposure of the thighs. As a result, a wrap-skirt had to be worn to hide the lower body and the crotch area. The jingyi was also used to protect its wearer from the cold and to protect its wearer's skin. In the Spring and Autumn period, trousers without crotches were still in use.

=== Warring States period, Qin dynasty ===
The Warring States period marks the beginning of the history of hedangku through the Hufuqishe policy adopted by King Wuling of Zhao. The hedangku with a loose rise was a form of Hufu, which were originally worn by the Northern nomadic peoples. Through the Hufuqishe policy, the Hufu-style hedangku with loose rise was introduced in Central China and first adopted and used by the military troops before eventually being used by the general populations in the succeeding dynasties. Under the influence of the Hufu-style hedangku with loose rise, the Chinese-style hedangku, referred as kun (裈; 褌; 'breeches/drawers')), was developed. The Hufu-style hedangku also influenced the jingyi-style ku leading to the lengthening of the ku to the thigh and to the development of a waist enclosure with an open rise and rear which allowed for urination and defecation, thus forming the basic form of ku as trousers with open rise. Since the rear and the rise of the ku trousers were both opened, a skirt continued to be worn to hide the genitals. An example of a typical form of ku trousers is the embroidered silk brocade ku discovered in the Mashan Chu tomb in Jiangling, Hubei province.

In a Qin dynasty manuscript called Zhiyi, however, the term kù (绔)) could also be used to refer to the kun while the rise of the trousers itself was referred as zi (子)). While new forms of ku trousers were developed, the jingyi-style ku continued to be worn until the early Han dynasty.

=== Han dynasty ===
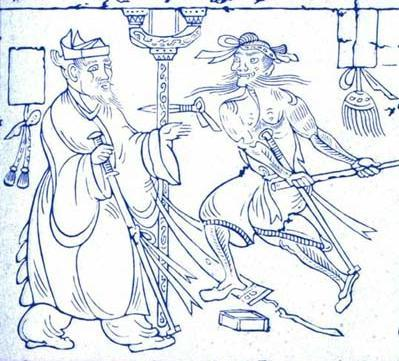
Ku (left) and kun (right), Han dynasty

There were variety of trousers in the Han dynasty, including full trousers with tampered cuffs. The shanku attire was worn by men in ordinary times.

In this period, the kun developed into new styles of Chinese trousers, such as dashao (大袑) which were trousers with extremely wide legs and the dakouku (大口褲), which was a type of trousers which were tied with strings under the knees in this period. The kun however was rarely used by the general population and were only used by warriors and servants during this period as the members of the high society were still deeply influenced by the traditional etiquette of the Han culture and found the kun disgraceful for allowing the exposure of its wearer's leg shape; moreover, people had difficulty adjusting to the use of the kun in their everyday lifestyle and routines as they were used to their traditional ku. In the chapter Jijiupian (急就篇) by Shi You during the Western Han dynasty, the zheku (褶袴) consisted of the zhekukun (褶袴褌), a wide-legged kun which were bound with strings at the around the knees, and was worn with a tight knee-length chanyu (襜褕) robe.

Compared to the kun, the ku was more acceptable in the Han tradition and became an important form of garment attire item in Hanfu. A typical form of ku in the Han dynasty had two complete legs connected to the waist with a piece of fabric which would cover the abdomen but leave the hips uncovered; an example of this form of ku can be found in the Mawangdui Han tomb at Changsha, Hunan Province; compared to the kun, this form of ku had a closed front rise and an open rear. In the Western Han dynasty, another form of ku, called qiongku (穷裤; 窮褲)), was designed for the maids living in the palace and was also worn in the imperial court. The qiongku was characterized with an upper part which covered the hip regions and a lower part which covered the lower legs; the rise and the waist of the qiongku is closed at the front and multiple strings were used to tie it at the back. According to the Biography of Queen Shangguan in the History of the Han dynasty, the qiongku was exclusively designed for the imperial concubines who were then forced to wear it; the reason behind it was to help queen Shangguan to monopolize the favour of Emperor Zhao Di and to produce an heir; the use of qiongku would therefore prevent Emperor Zhao Di from having sexual activities with other imperial concubines.

=== Wei, Jin, Northern and Southern dynasties ===
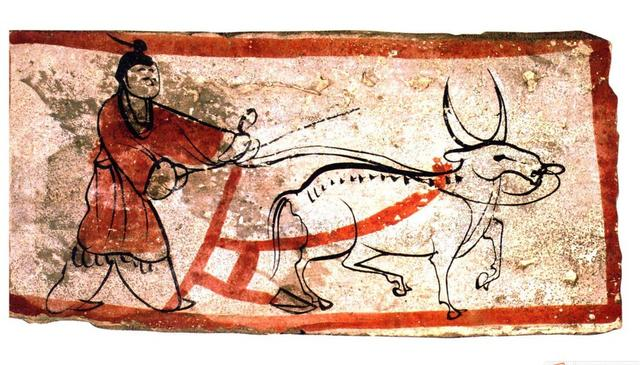
Full trousers with tampered cuffs, early Six dynasties

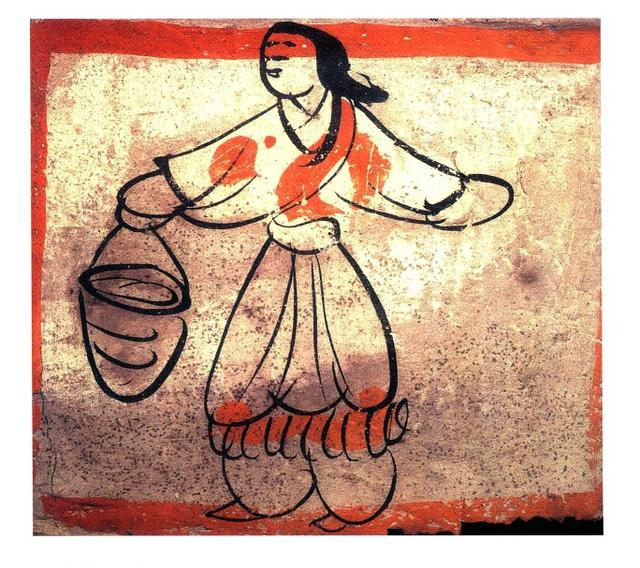
Trousers under ruqun, early Six dynasties

In the early Six dynasties period, the trousers which were worn by commoners were similar to those worn in the Han dynasty having full legs with tapered cuffs. Male commoners continued to wore it in their shanku while female commoners could either wore it in their shanku or under their ruqun. In the Jin dynasty, clothing did not change much and trousers were worn by servants and people with low status.

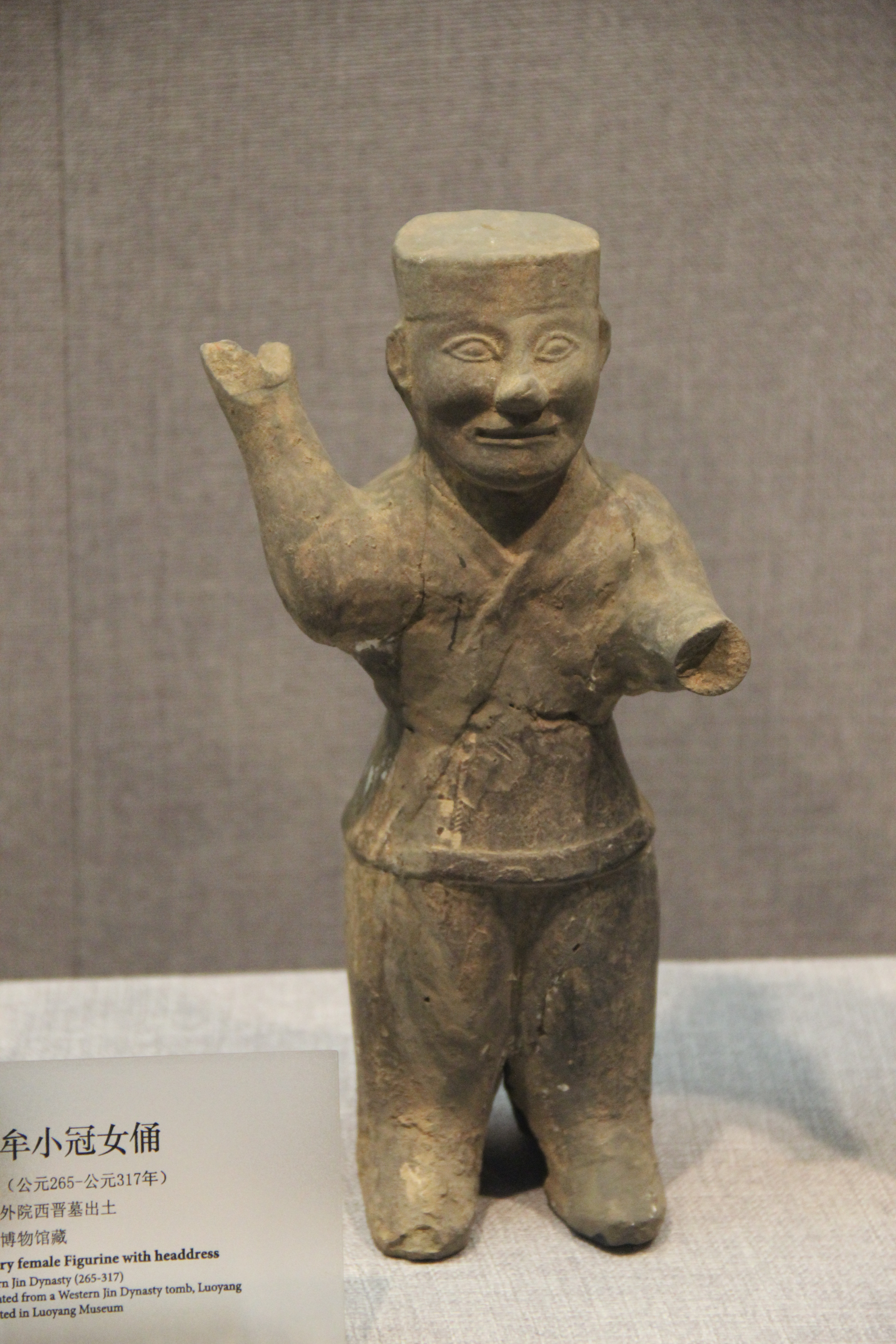
Kun without knee-binding, Western Jin

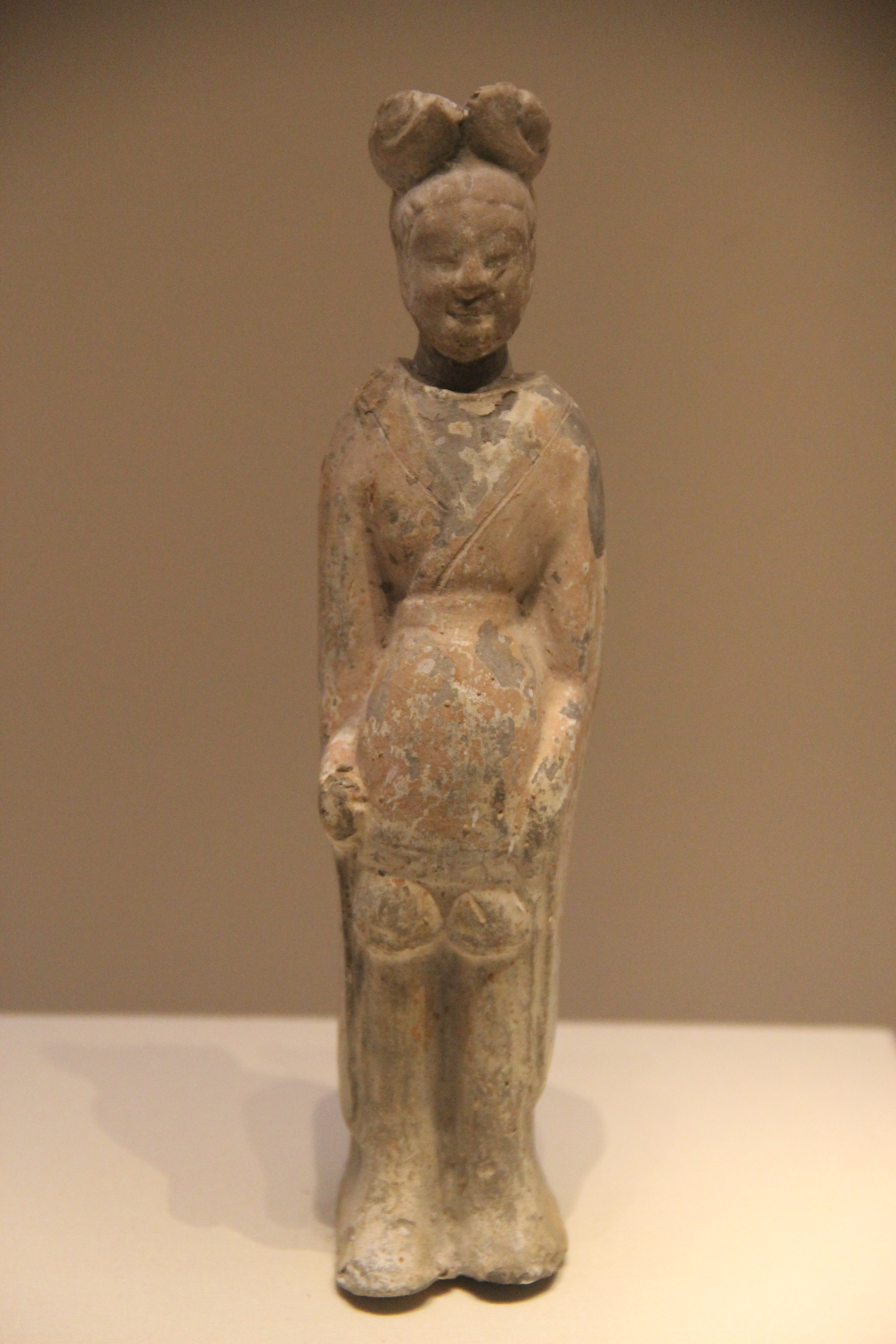
Kuzhefu consisting of dakouku (or fuku), Northern Qi.

During the Wei, Jin, Northern and Southern dynasties, the dakouku (especially the wide-bottomed dakouku) became a common form of kun amongst the nobles and the commoners. This style of knee-bound kun was also known as fuku. By binding the trousers below the knees, the dakouku would facilitate movements, including when horseback riding or when men were on duty. The chord used to bind the knees were made out of felt in the Western Jin; however, as the use of felt was a product of the Eurasian steppes; it was assumed to be Hufu by the contemporary observers of this period. In fact, while the dakouku was designed under the influence of the ancient Hufu-style hedangku, it was a Chinese innovation and was not a form of Hufu. In the Northern Wei, some women started to wear dakouku instead of skirts under the influence of the northern nomads. When the dakouku was matched with a tight knee-length upper garment, it formed the kuzhefu, which then became both the military and official attire in both the north and south of China at those times. The kuzhefu was a popular form of attire until the Sui and Tang dynasties.

=== Sui and Tang dynasties ===
In the Tang dynasty, the dakouku were only used by warriors and the guards of honour. The hedangku became popular amongst women who wore it under their skirt. New form of trousers then appeared with narrow legs instead of loose legs.

=== Song dynasty and Yuan dynasty ===
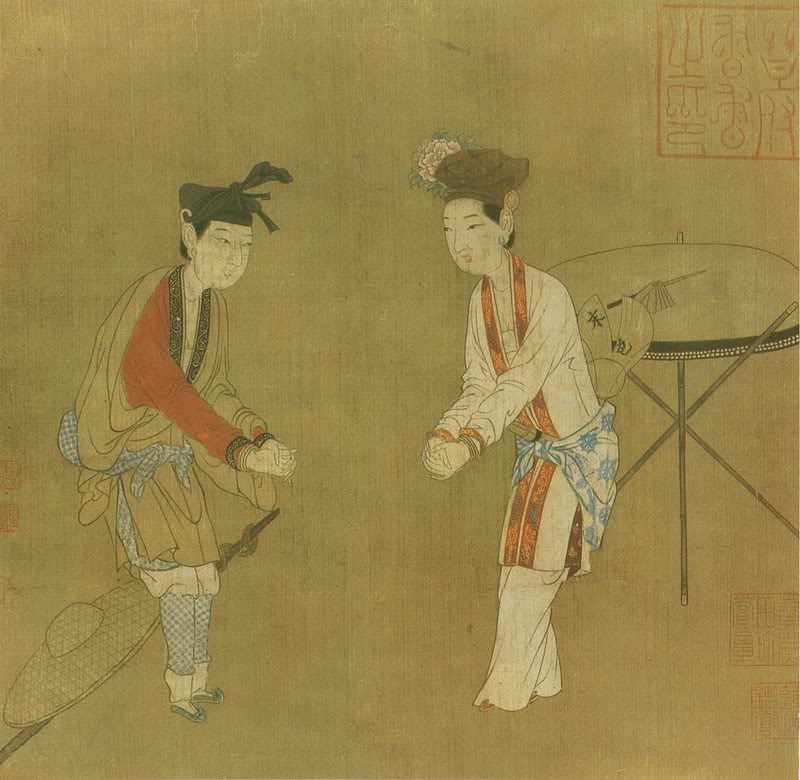
Right: woman wearing xiaoku; left: woman wearing xiku, Song dynasty painting.

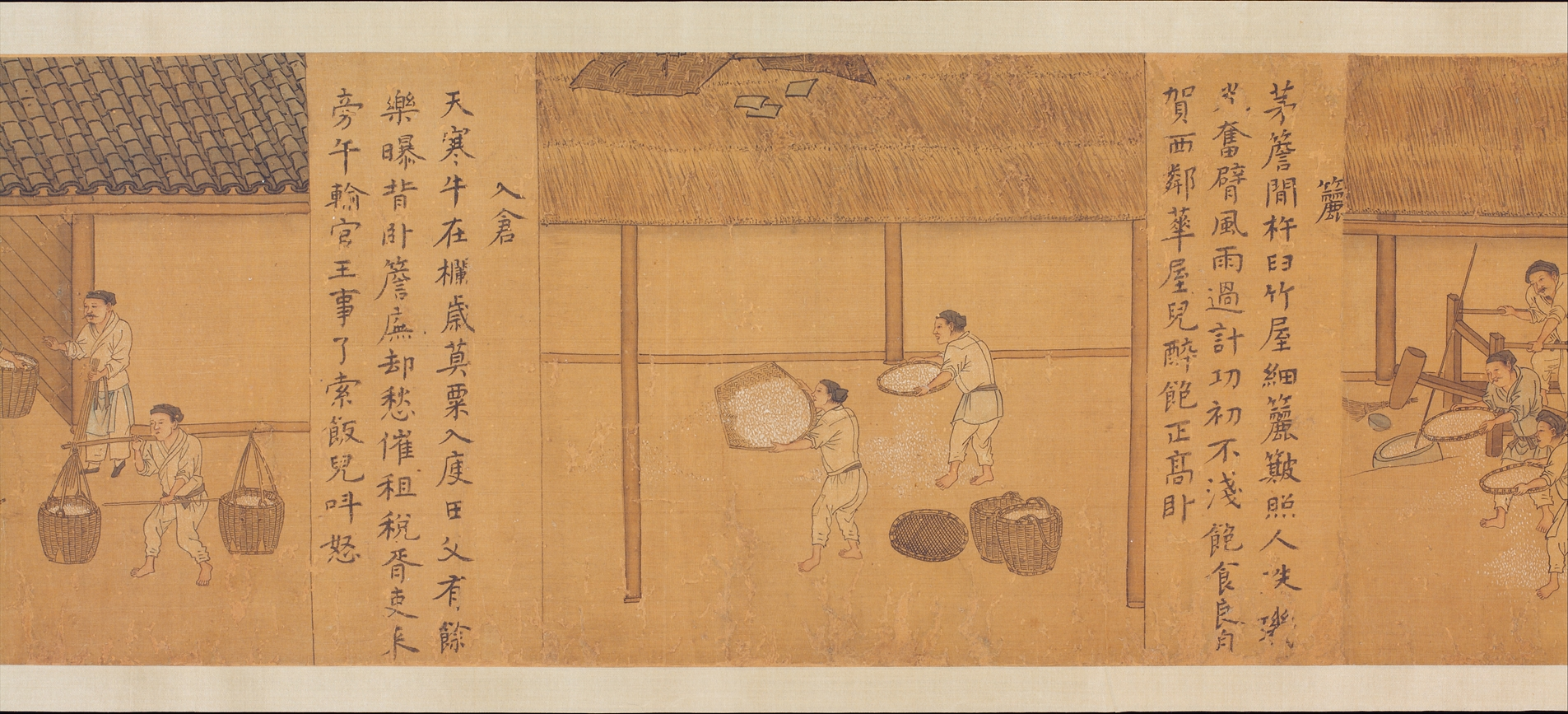
Farmers in narrow legged-trousers, c. Song to Yuan dynasty, before 1353

Trousers with narrow legs, called xiaoku, were worn by the general population.

The xiku (膝裤), a jingyi-style ku, first appeared in the Song dynasty. It became so popular that it was occasionally worn by the Emperors. The xiku remained popular in the Yuan dynasty. A style of xiku was called kuwa; however, the wearing of kuwa was forbidden for noble ladies and only actresses were allowed to wear them when performing in drama theatres.

=== Ming dynasty ===
In the Ming dynasty, xiku evolved into another jingyi-style ku called taoku (套袴); the taoku however had to be worn over other forms of trousers. Trousers continued to be worn by both genders either under the paofu or skirt of the ruqun.

=== 21st century ===
==== Ethnic clothing ====
The jingyi-style ku remains popular among minority ethnicities, such as the Hani and the Miao women; they are now referred as jiaotong.

== Derivatives and influences ==
- Hakama
- Baji
- Chinese-style trousers were adopted in the precursor of the áo dài in during the Nguyễn dynasty in Vietnam.

== See also ==
- Hanfu
- Hufu
- Ruqun
- Shanku
