= Lingzi =

Traditional Chinese pheasant feathers decoration on headwear

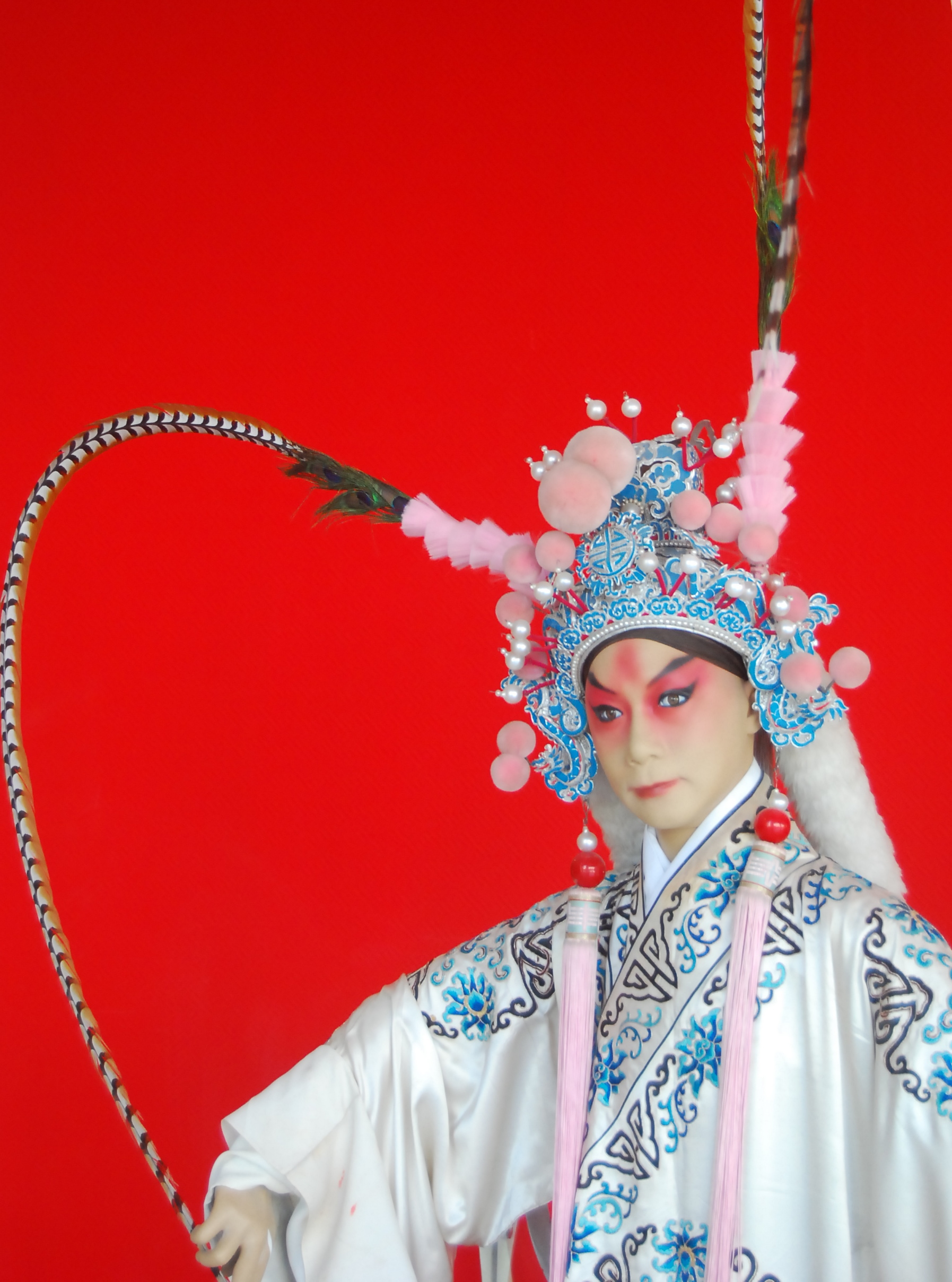
- Chinese: 翎子
Transcriptions
Standard Mandarin
- Hanyu Pinyin: Língzi

Lingzi (Chinese: 翎子), also called zhiling (Chinese: 雉翎), refers to a traditional Chinese ornament which uses long pheasant tail feather appendages to decorate some headdress in Xifu, Chinese opera costumes. In Chinese opera, the lingzi not only decorative purpose but are also used to express thoughts, feelings, and the drama plot. They are typically used on the helmets of warriors, where a pair of pheasant feathers extensions are the indicators that the character is a warrior figure; the length of the feathers, on the other hand, is an indicator of the warrior's rank. The lingzi are generally about five or six feet long. Most of the time, lingzi are used to represent handsome military commanders.

== Origins ==
It is suggested that the use of lingzi originated from the wuguan (Chinese: 武冠; pinyin: wǔguān; lit. 'military cap'), a form of guan used by the military officials since the ancient times. Similar headgear decorated with pairs of lingzi worn the military can be seen in paintings dating to the Ming dynasty.

=== Wuguan ===
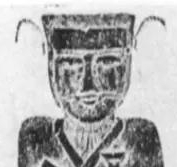
A guard wearing wuguan (武冠) decorated with a pair of pheasant feathers, Han dynasty.

During the Warring States period, King Wuling of Zhao adopted the hufuqishe policy and a hufu-style guan which looks similar to the conical hat of the Scythian was adopted. King Wuling's hufu-style guan was less pointy than the actual Scythian hat and he decorated his hat with a marten tail to denote his noble status. The King of Qin later give the hufu-style guan of King Wuling to his servant as an insult to King Wuling after the latter had destroyed the regime of the Zhao state.

King Huiwen of Zhao later wore the same hufu-style guan as his father, King Wuling; and therefore this type of guan was named zhaohuiwenguan (Chinese: 趙惠文冠; pinyin: zhàohuìwénguān; lit. 'Crown of King Huiwen of Zhao'). Many years later, the zhaohuiwenguan evolved into the military cap called wuguan. (Note: The wuguan (武冠) is often translated as "military cap" in English language literature and sources.)

By the Han dynasty, a wuguan decorated with pheasant feathers became known as heguan (Chinese: 鶡冠; pinyin: héguān; lit. 'long-tailed pheasant hat') and was used by the military officials of the Han dynasty. The heguan was first worn in the state of Zhao to distinguish military officers during the Warring States period. The heguan was possibly itself derived from the hufu-style guan adopted by King Wuling through hufuqishe policy. The snow pheasant (Chinese: 鶡; pinyin: hé) was a symbolism of martial valour and courage due to its association with the snow pheasant which would fight its opponent until death.

== Skills and manipulation ==
The skills required to manipulate the two pheasant feathers are known as Lingze. These skills include shaking and swinging; sometimes the lingzi are shaken with one hand but sometimes two hands are used. The skills of Lingze are used by many roles; however, they are especially used in the Xiaosheng role.

When combined the movements of the head and body of the actor, the movement of the lingzi express the feelings and dispositions of the character, which include the expression of surprise, hatred, happiness, and frivolity.

== See also ==
- Chinese opera
- Guan
- Xifu – Chinese opera costume
- Hanfu
- Guzhuang

== Gallery ==
Lingzhi

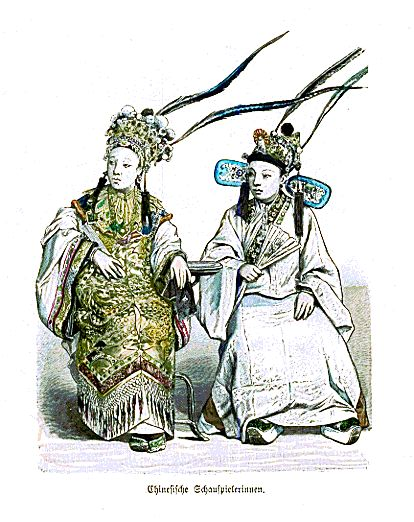
Chinese actresses in Malaysia, 1880

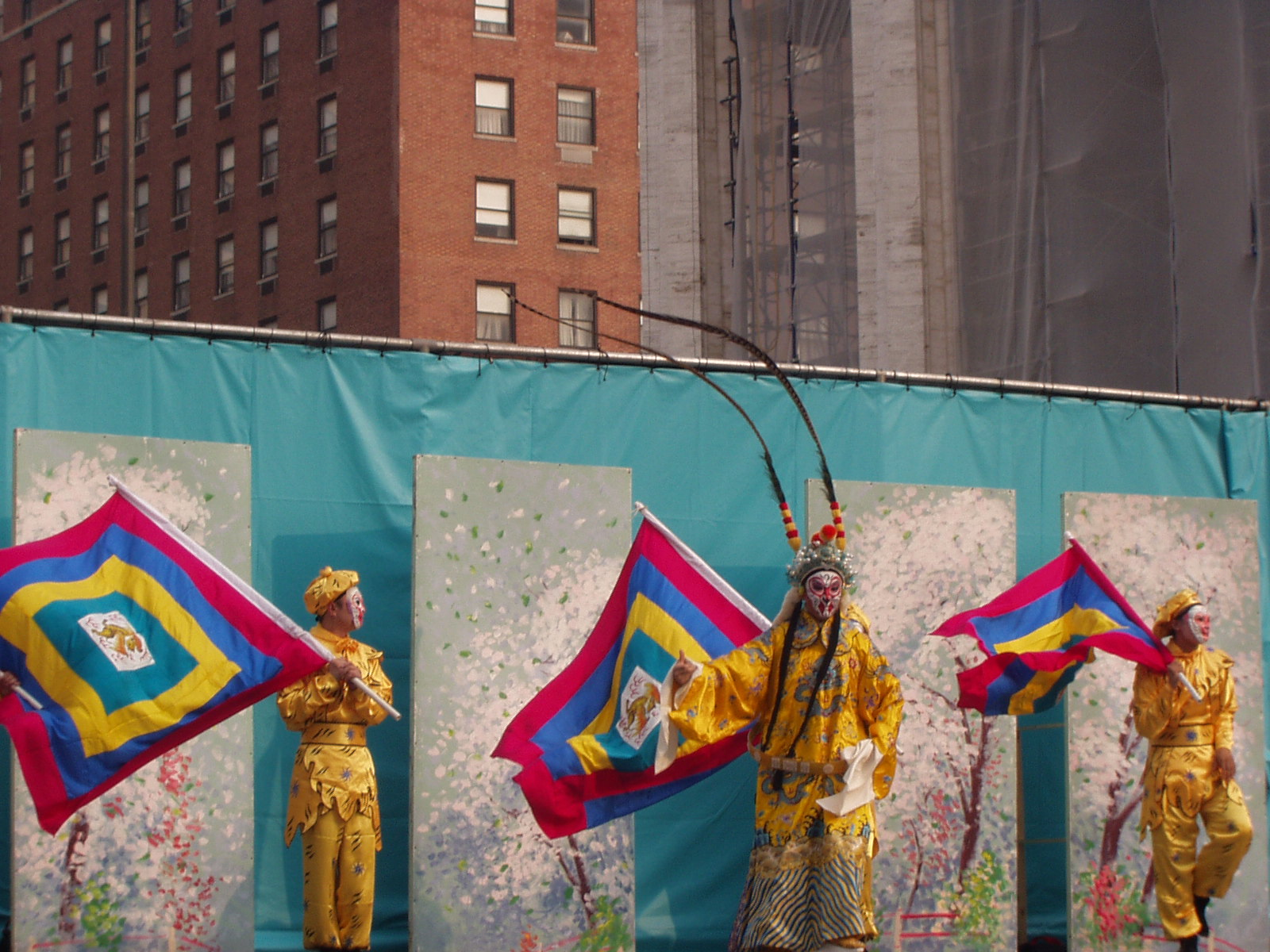
