= Guzhuang (costume) =

Fantasy-based Chinese costumes inspired by ancient Chinese clothing

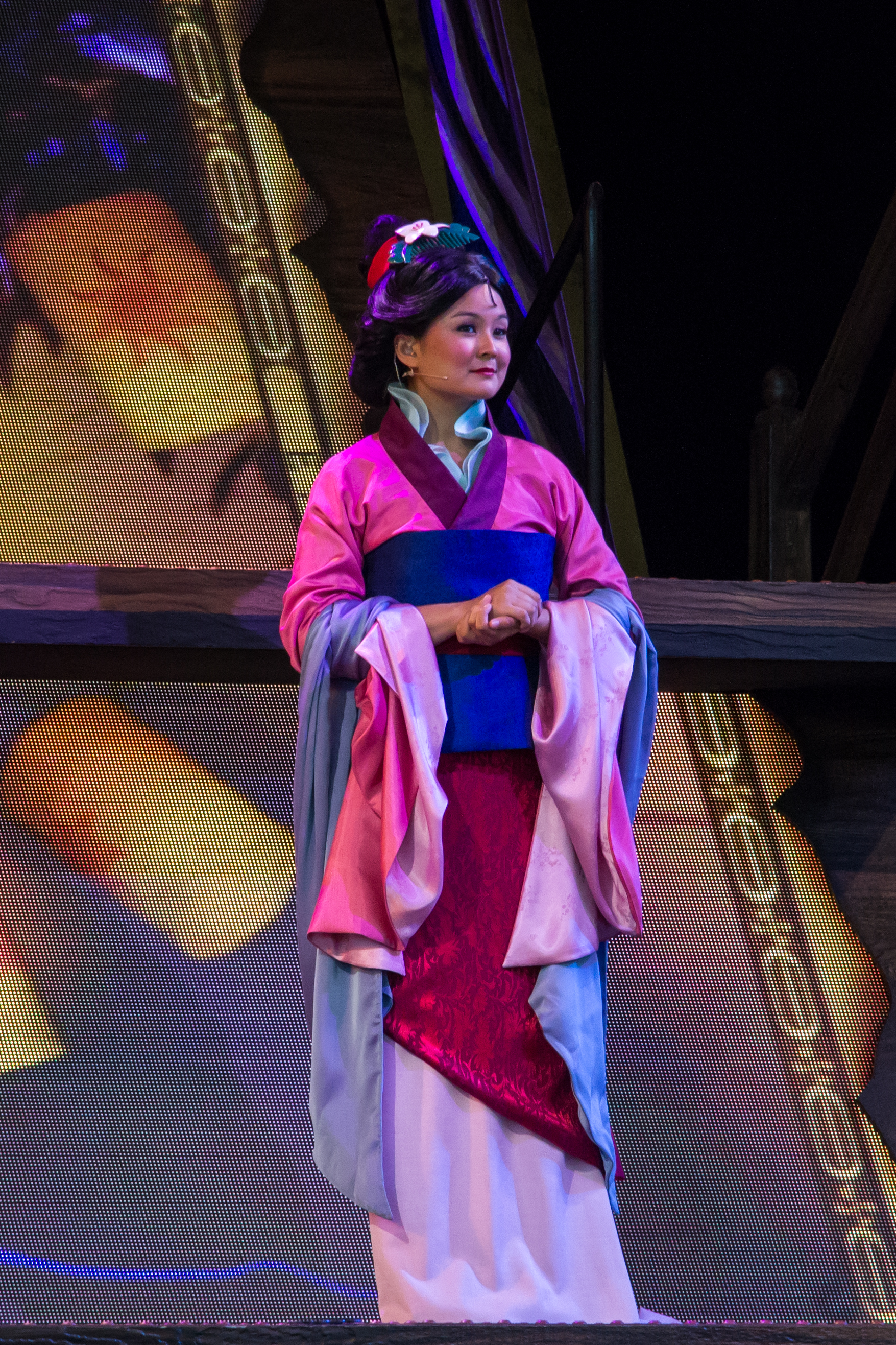
- An example of guzhuang, a fantasy-based costume inspired by ancient Chinese clothing which shows historical inaccuracies.
- Chinese: 古装
- Literal meaning: Ancient costume
Transcriptions
Standard Mandarin
- Hanyu Pinyin: Gǔzhuāng

Guzhuang (Chinese: 古装; pinyin: gǔzhuāng; lit. 'ancient costume'), also called ancient-style dress, refers to a style of Chinese costume attire which are styled or inspired by ancient Chinese clothing (typically Hanfu or Qizhuang). Guzhuang is typically used as stage clothes in Chinese opera and in Chinese television drama, such as in period drama which are normally set in imperial China prior to 1911, and in the Wuxia and Xianxia genre. While the style of guzhuang is based on ancient Chinese clothing, guzhuang show historical inaccuracies.

== Chinese opera ==
In Chinese opera, plays depicting guzhuang is called guzhuangxi (Chinese: 古装戏; pinyin: gǔzhuāngxì; lit. 'ancient costume drama'), also known as guzhuangxinxi (Chinese: 古装新戏; pinyin: gǔzhuāngxīnxì; lit. 'ancient costume in new drama'), or guzhuanggewuju (lit. 'ancient-costume song-dance drama'), were performed by Mei Lanfang. (Note: Guzhuang xinxi depicted plays which were adaptations of Chinese stories and folklores, such as Chang'e flies to the moon and Daiyu buries flowers.) Guzhuangxi is an important concept in both the field of Chinese opera and to early Chinese film.Mei Lanfang is also credited for having invented guzhuangbanxiang (Chinese: 古装扮相; pinyin: gǔzhuāngbànxiāng; lit. 'ancient-style stage images') which include the set of guzhuang that he created along with guzhuang tou (lit. 'ancient-style hairstyle').

This form of guzhuang emerged in 1915 when new Chinese opera costumes had to be created for a new category of female role which had also been developed by Mei Lanfang. (Note: This new category of role was called huashan (lit. 'flower shirt'), which combined the movements of qingyi, huadan, and martial dan.) Therefore, Mei Lanfang designed new female costumes by referring to ancient Chinese sculpturesand to ancient Chinese paintings, especially women in classical Chinese scroll paintings, often based on from mythological figures. His goal was to make his costumes more elegant instead of making it look ancient.His costume designs then became known as guzhuang due to their relationship with ancient China, in particular the pre-Qing dynasty period from which his costumes designs were based.

The guzhuang designed by Mei Lanfang is characterized with fitted waist. The guzhuang developed by Mei Lanfang different from the traditional Chinese opera costumes in some aspects: the skirts were longer; the skirt was worn under the jacket to make the character look slimmer; the water sleeves were longer and wider; and the accessories were less gaudy. Other performers such as Ouyang Yuqian and Feng Zihe also contributed to the development of the guzhuang design.

== Chinese television and entertainment media ==
Guzhuang are typically used in Chinese television drama and movies. They are often depicted in the guzhuangpian, Wuxia, and Xianxia genre. Guzhuang is also depicted in animations, including donghua and Chinese-theme animations produced outside of China.

=== Relationship with film and drama genre ===
The first film produced in China was Dingjun Mountain in 1905 which depicted extracted scenes from a Beijing opera play performed by Tan Xinpei. The film was based on the 70th and 71st chapters of the Romance of the Three Kingdoms. In terms of genre, it can be classified as xiqupian (Chinese: 戏曲片; pinyin: xìqǔpiàn; lit. 'Opera film'), a historical costume film, or Wuxia. The 1920s was marked by the adaptation of traditional Chinese indigenous genre into cinema. These genres were adapted from Chinese literature and from the Chinese opera stage play as a countermovement against the prevalence of European and American film products. The Tianyi Film Company was a major studio which specialized in Chinese genres at that time; its succeeding company, the Shaw Brothers Studio in Hong Kong continued to produce indigenous Chinese genres, such as Huangmei opera films and guzhuang epics. (Note: The costumes which are typically worn in Huangmei opera are typically guzhuang-style. See page Xifu (costume) for more details)

==== Guzhuangpian and xiqupian ====
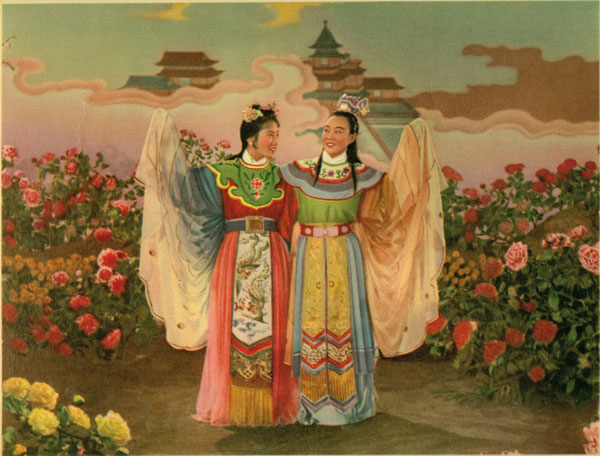
Guzhuang worn in the Liang Shanbo and Zhu Yingtai, a 1954 film.

Guzhuangpian (Chinese: 古裝片; pinyin: gǔzhuāngzpiàn; lit. 'ancient costume film'), also known as period costume film, is indigenous genre to China and first emerged in the 1920s in China. This genre is similar to costume drama, period film, and historical film. However, by definition the term gu (Chinese: 古; pinyin: gǔ), which literally means "ancient", does not refer to films and dramas which are set in the Republic of China as the Republican period is a symbol of modernity and the end of tradition.

Guzhuang are therefore depicted in period drama (i.e. historical drama, which is also called guzhuang drama) which are normally set in imperial China prior to 1911. Guzhuangpian also typically depict adaptations of traditional Chinese folktales, plays, and popular novels. As a distinct genre, it is characterized by its focus on ancient history and historical personalities.

Some of the early Chinese movies depicting guzhuang were based on Chinese opera play and Chinese folklore, such as Liang Zhu tongshi (1926) and White Snake (1926) released by Tianyi Film Company; Liang Shanbo and Zhu Yingtai produced in 1953 by the Shanghai Film Studio.

==== Wuxia, Shenguai, and Xianxia ====
The tradition of Wuxia is over two thousand years old having been passed through Chinese folklore, novels, historiography, and popular performing traditions (such as Tanci and Chinese opera). The origins of Wuxia genre in cinema, however, is quite recent and emerged in the 20th century. In cinema, the Wuxia genre can be traced back to the guzhuangpian and shenguaipian genre as one of its derivatives.

The shenguaipian (Chinese: 神怪片) genre, which often depicts Xian-immortals and demons, was also developed in the 20th century and was also a derivatives of the guzhuangpian.

The Wuxia genre was initiated by the Tianyi Film Company in 1925. The early Wuxia genre, however, was also not always guzhuangpian; and therefore, it did not always involve the wearing of guzhuang. In the 21st century, the Wuxia genre can be a guzhuangpian and a shenguaipian movie. The Wuxia genre tends to dress its characters into guzhuang.

The Xianxia genre, which has grown in popularity in the 21st century, is a sub-genre of Wuxia. The Xianxia genre typically involves Xian-immortals and immortality cultivation.

=== Characteristics and costume design ===
Most guzhuang used in the production of television dramas, movies and animations do not conform to historical facts and/or are fantasy-inspired. Some guzhuang are based on different existing historical clothing worn in different dynasties, and/or inspired by Chinese opera costumes, and murals (e.g. Dunhuang frescoes); they would sometimes have features, or have attire, added, removed, simplified, to create a desired visual impact or to meet the production needs. It is also possible for various ethnic Chinese elements to be mixed and matched when designing guzhuang; combining modern fashion elements and/or western-style clothing elements can also be done.

When designing guzhuang for films and television dramas, costumes designers consider the modern aesthetic taste of its audience while also conforming and respecting the historical reality. The guzhuang used in the Xianxia genre, for example, is based on the historical hanfu, but is modernized in terms of design resulting in the guzhuang being different from its historical version.

Moreover, in most movies and television drama, the colours, style, and pattern of guzhuang are also based on the characters found in the script; these costumes characteristics are used to better shape the character's image and to allow the audience better understand the character through his visual image and to allow for the distinction between characters. Characters wearing guzhuang, for example, can have a colour theme which reflect his initial personality; however, this colour theme may change throughout the character development. It is also impossible for costume designers to fully restore garment and garment-related artefacts; and therefore, guzhuang designers need to innovate their costume designs based on historical facts.

=== List of movies, drama, and animations featuring guzhuang ===
Examples of movies and dramas which uses guzhuang are: The cave of the Silken Web (1927), Luoyang bridge (1928), Dragon Inn (1967), a Chinese Ghost Story (1987), The Swordsman (1990), Swordsman II (1992) and The East Is Red (1993), Ashes of Time (1994), Hero (2002), House of Flying Daggers (2004), Curse of the golden flower (2006), The Empress of China (2014), The Journey of Flower (2015), The Princess Weiyoung (2016), Eternal Love (2017), Ruyi's Royal Love in the Palace (2018), The Untamed (2019), (Note: see page The Untamed: Design and Concept for more details.) Mulan (2020 Film), and Word of Honour (2021), etc. Example of animations which depicts guzhuang are: Mulan (1998 film), Kungfu panda.

== Literature, web-novels, and comics ==
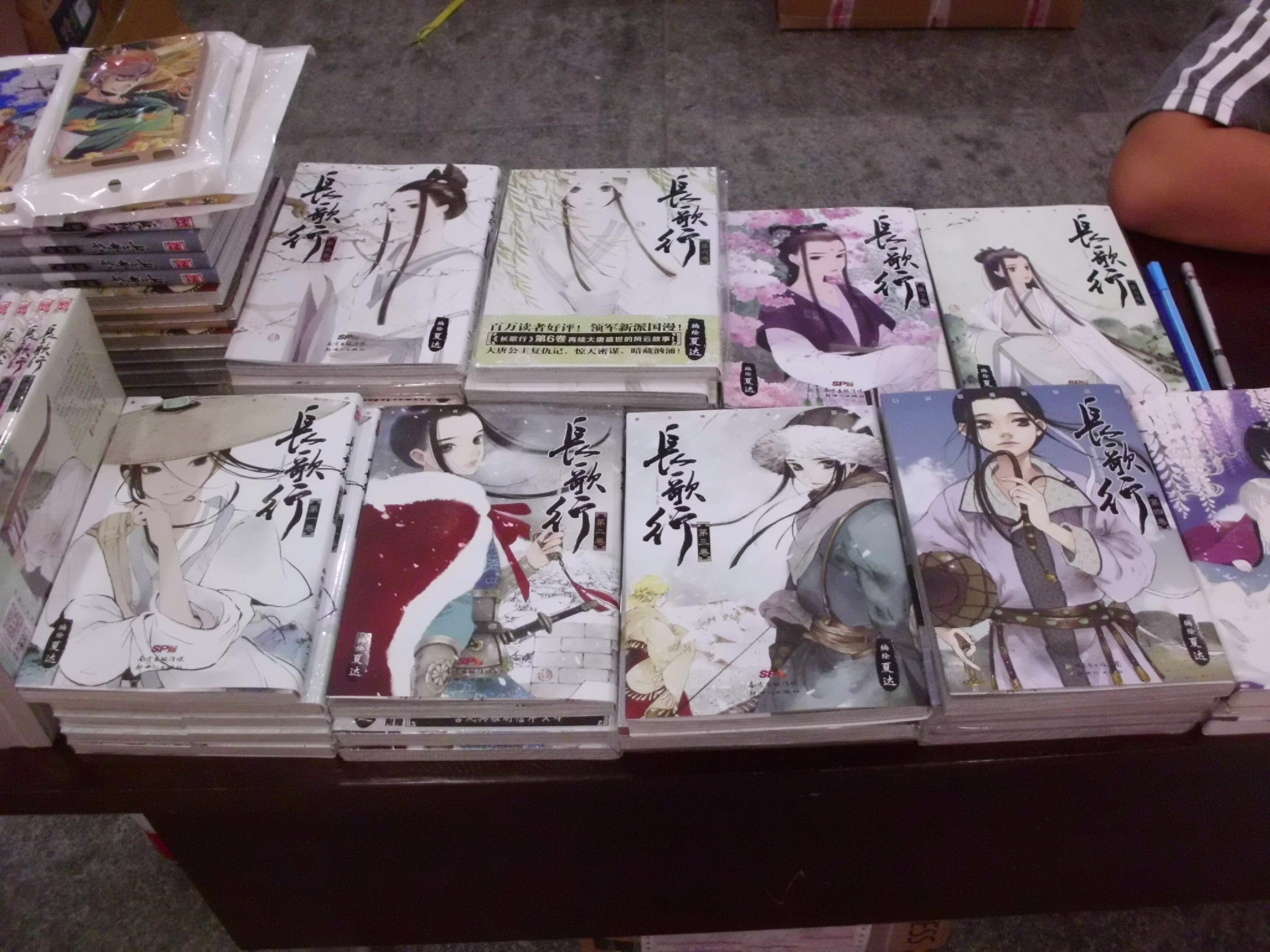
Guzhuang worn in Chang Ge Xing (长歌行), an example of gufeng manhua, Hangzhou library.

Guzhuang can be found in Manhua, such as gufeng manhua (lit. 'ancient-style manhua') and shaonu manhua. Shaonu manhua is a similar genre and a derivative of the shoujo manga; it originally followed similar visual aesthetics as the Japanese shoujo manga in its early development before starting to develop Chinese characteristics between the 2000s and early 2010, after 2010s, shaonu manhua became distinct from the Japanese shoujo manga both in terms of visual aesthetics and storyline. In the mid-2010s, gufeng manhua and gufeng shaonu manhua (i.e. stories adapted from Chinese history and legendary tales, and fictional love stories set in imperial China) became popular. Examples of guzhuang depicted in manhua can be found in Chang an Fantastic Night (长安幻夜) by Han Lu, You Yuan Jing Meng (游园惊梦) by Xia Da (released in 2008), Chang Ge Xing by Xia Da, Gu Fang Bu Zi Shang (孤芳不自賞) by Feng Nong, etc. Guzhuang can also be found in manhwa, such as Bride of the Water God by Yun Mi-kyung, and in the Chinese-theme Japanese manga, such as Saiunkoku Monogatari by Yura Kairi.

== Influences and derivatives ==
=== Wei-Jin Style Hanfu ===
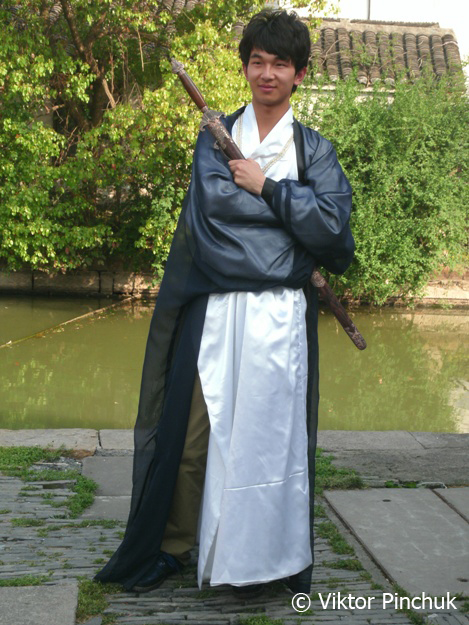
A boy wearing a Wei-Jin style hanfu

Guzhuang is often confused with or misinterpreted as Hanfu by most people who are not familiar with Hanfu. And, some Hanfu enthusiasts also wear it instead of wearing Hanfu. Guzhuang is, however, also a factor of influence (among many others) to the design of modern Hanfu; for example, the design of Wei-Jin style (Chinese: 魏晋风; pinyin: Wèijìnfēng; lit. 'Wei Jin style') Hanfu is a relatively modern design which was influenced by Chinese movies and television drama series and does not exist in history. (Note: The Wei-jin style should not be confused with the Hanfu worn in the Wei and Jin dynasties, see page Hanfu for more details.) Guzhuang found in Xianxia television drama have also left a deep impact on Chinese audience. Many Xianxia fans also wear Hanfu in their everyday lives, which then promote the growing Hanfu industry.

=== Xiuhefu ===
Another guzhuang-style costume which has influenced modern clothing in modern-day China is the Xiuhefu designed by costume designer Ye Jintian in 2001 for the role of drama female character Xiu He, played by Chinese actress Zhou Xun, in the Chinese television drama Juzi Hongle (橘子紅了; 'Orange turned red'), a drama set in the Republican era of China. Although the drama was set in the Republic of China, the costume was mainly inspired by the Hanfu of the Qing dynasty, especially those used in the late years of the Qing dynasty in the 1910s as part of the bridal attire. While basing himself on the clothing of the Qing dynasty, Ye Jintian, however, did not fully respected the historical accuracy of the dress and instead mixed several elements together from similar eras in his costume design. As the Xiuhefu gives a feeling of dignity and beauty to its wearer, the Xiuhefu designed by Ye Jintian became progressively popular and eventually became a form of traditional Chinese-style wedding dress chosen by many Chinese brides during their marriage nowadays.

== See also ==
- Hanfu
- Hanfu movement
- Qizhuang
- Chinese opera
- List of Chinese television series
