= Mangfu =

Python robe, a Chinese robe with 4-claw dragon-like creature

- A form of mangfu in the Ming dynasty

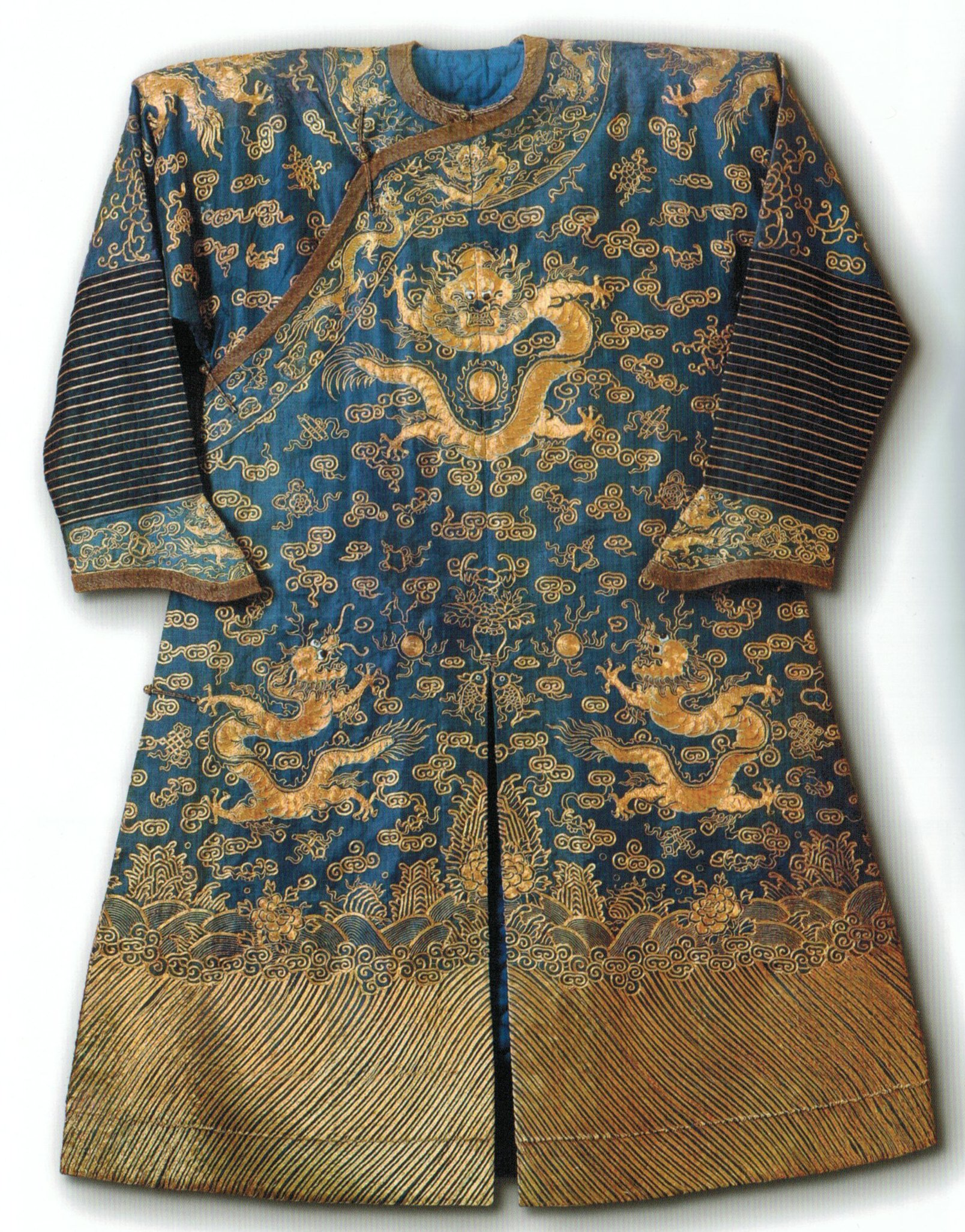
- A court robe with mang (python) pattern in the Qing dynasty, c. 1890s

Chinese name
- Chinese: 蟒服
- Literal meaning: Python clothing/ Python robe
Transcriptions
Standard Mandarin
- Hanyu Pinyin: Mǎngfú

Mangpao
- Chinese: 蟒袍
- Literal meaning: Python robe
Transcriptions
Standard Mandarin
- Hanyu Pinyin: Mǎngpáo

Huayi
- Chinese: 花衣
- Literal meaning: Flower clothing
Transcriptions
Standard Mandarin
- Hanyu Pinyin: Huāyī

Vietnamese name
- Vietnamese alphabet: mãng bào
- Chữ Hán: 蟒袍

English name
- English: Python robe/ Dragon robe

Mangfu (Chinese: 蟒服; pinyin: mǎngfú; lit. 'python clothing/python garment'), also known as mǎngpáo (蟒袍; 'python robe'), Huāyī (花衣; 'flower clothing'), and python robe, sometimes referred as dragon robe although they are different garments, is a type of paofu, a robe, in hanfu. The mangfu falls under the broad category of mǎngyī (蟒衣; 'python clothes'), where the mangfu is considered the classic form of mangyi. The mangfu was characterized by the use of an embroidery pattern called mǎng (蟒; 'python'), although this is a name for a four-clawed Chinese dragon-like creature, not a python snake. The mangfu was derived from the lóngpáo (龙袍; 龍袍; 'dragon robe') in order to differentiate monarchs and subjects; i.e. only the Emperor is allowed to wear the long, five-clawed dragon, while his subjects wear mang. The mangfu was worn in the Ming and Qing dynasties. They had special status among the Chinese court clothing as they were only second to the longpao. Moreover, their use were restricted, and they were part of a special category of clothing known as cìfú (赐服; 賜服; 'bestowed clothing'), which could only be awarded by the Chinese Emperor (or by the Empress Dowager on the behalf of the Emperor) in the Ming and Qing dynasties, becoming "a sign of imperial favour". People who were bestowed with mangfu could not exchange it with or gifted it to other people. They were worn by members of the imperial family below of crown prince, by military and civil officials, and by Official wives. As an official clothing, the mangfu were worn by officials during celebration occasions and ceremonial events. They could also be bestowed by the Emperor to people who performed extraordinary services to the empire as rewards, to the members of the Grand Secretariat and to prominent Daoist patriarchs, imperial physicians, tributary countries and local chiefs whose loyalty were considered crucial to secure the borders. The mangfu is also used as a form of xifu, theatrical costume, in Chinese opera, where it is typically found in the form of a round-necked robe, known as yuanlingpao. In Beijing opera, the mangfu used as xifu is known as Mang.

== Mang embroidery design ==
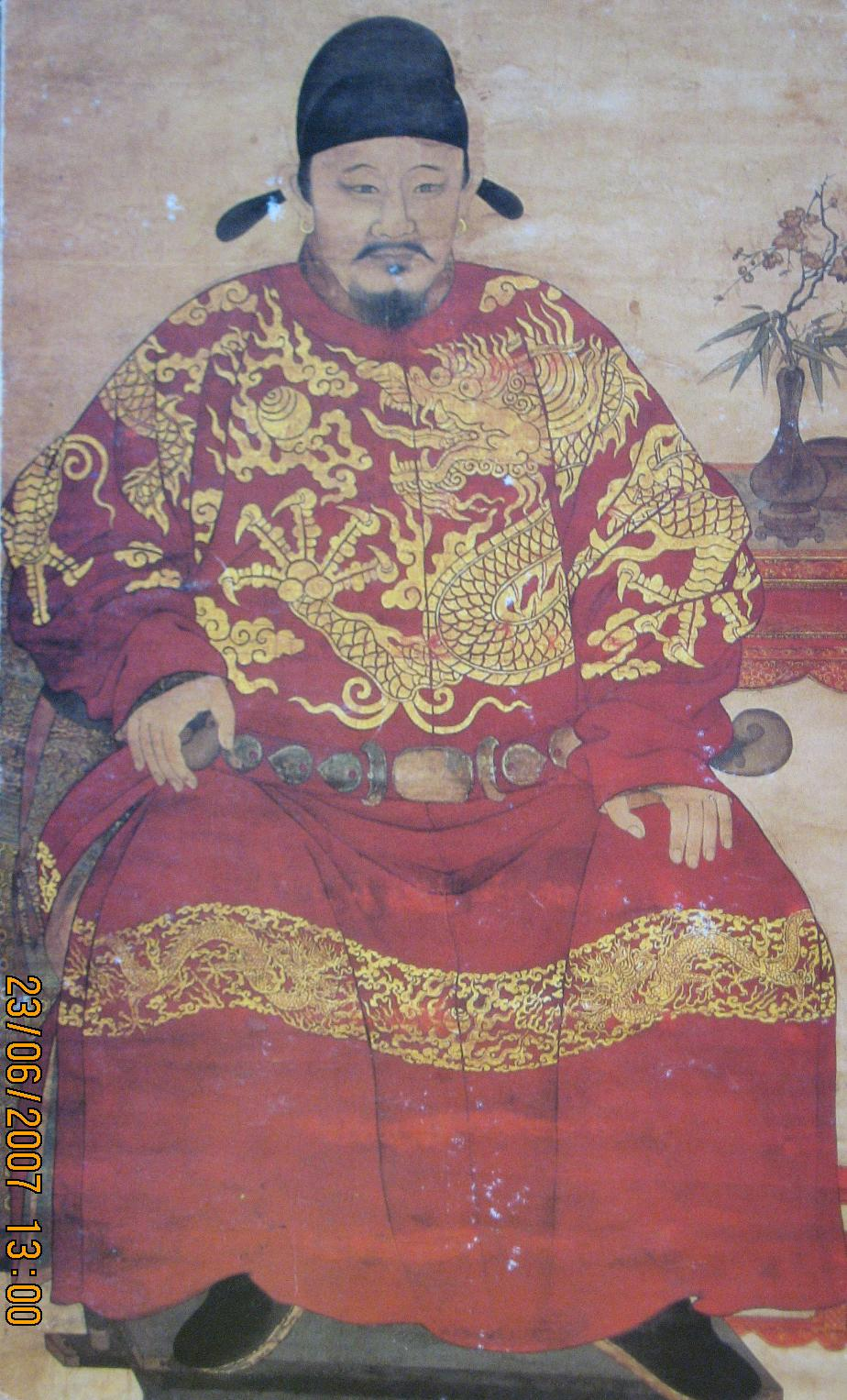
A man wearing long pattern design.

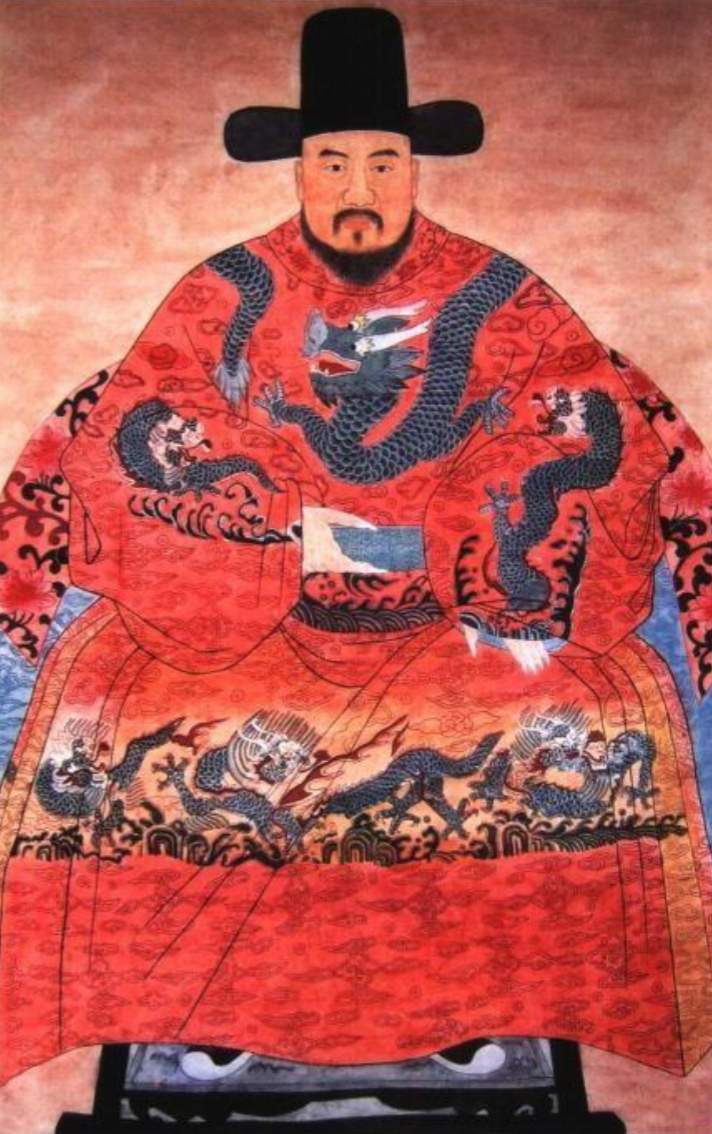
Gao Gong wearing a danmang pattern design

Difference between long and mang decorative designs, Ming dynasty

In ancient China, there was a clear difference between monarchs and subjects; therefore, the Emperor wore the Chinese dragon long patterns on his clothing, called lóngpáo (龙袍; 龍袍; 'dragon robe'). Officials, being the subjects of the Emperor, wore the mǎng (蟒; 'python'). The mang embroidery is actually an imaginary creature in the form of a four-clawed Chinese dragon, which was derived from the design of the imperial 5-clawed Chinese dragon long.

In the Ming dynasty, Bian Yong, the Chief Censor of the Emperor Hongzhi, described the mang as having "no horns and legs"; however, during his time:

the mang robe worn by internal officials (eunuchs) is very similar to the image of the dragon", therefore not fitting the regulations

Shen Defu also described the mang as being similar to the long in appearance, with the number of their claws as the main difference:

The mang robe is a garment with an image close to a dragon, similar to the dragon robe of the top authority (the emperor), except for the deduction of one claw.

After the Ming dynasty, the legend went that a long would be demoted to a mang if it lost one of its claw.

Shen Defu also explained that the most valued form of mang pattern was the zuomang (坐蟒; 'seated python') which a frontal view mang on the back and front region of the robe; there were other form of mang pattern such as the danmang (單蟒), which faces on the right side.

== History ==
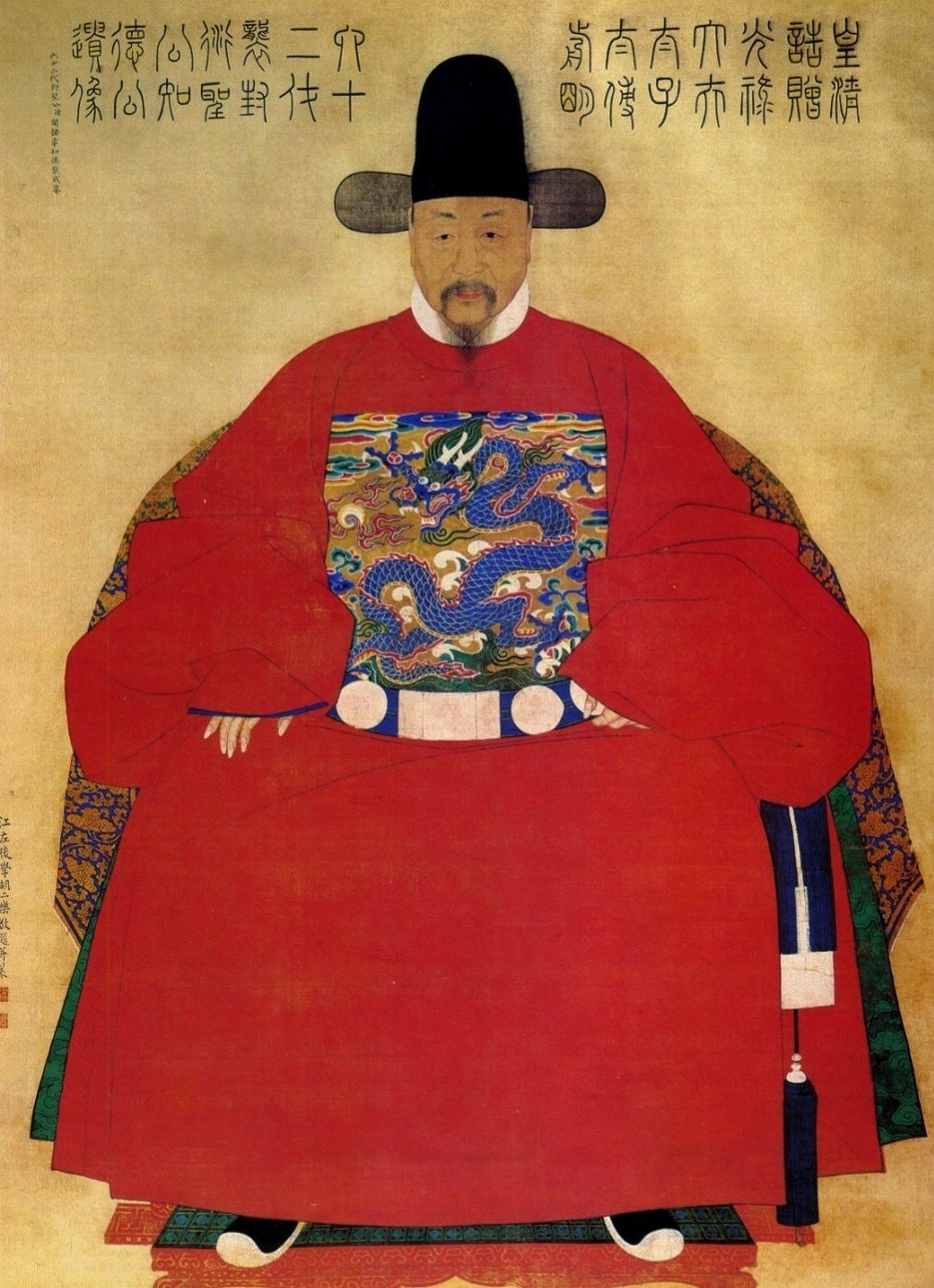
Duke Yanshen wearing a mangfu with a danmang in a buzi, Ming dynasty

In the Ming dynasty, the mangfu was a form of cifu along with feiyufu and douniufu; therefore, the right to bestow mangfu was only reserved to the Emperor who would bestow the robes to those he favoured. According to the Ming Shi (明史), the mangfu was prescribed for certain officials on specific occasions.

When Emperor Yongle became emperor, he relaxed the clothing regulations for the eunuchs; therefore, the eunuchs around the emperor wore Yesa-style robes which were decorated with mang patterns and were tied with a luandai (lit. 'Luan belt'), and even the eunuchs who were of high ranks were often found wearing mangfu. However, the wearing of mangfu by the eunuchs were improper.

According to Shen Defu, during the early reign of Zhengtong, the mangpao was bestowed to foreign rulers. In 1447, there was an imperial edict by Emperor Zhengtong which prohibited the production of mang patterns along with feiyu and douniu patterns by unauthorized people; it was therefore a capital offence for artisans:

There are clothing regulations for both officials and commoners. Now some people have custom-made robes embroidered with the prohibited patterns of four-clawed dragon [i.e. mang], five-clawed dragon [i.e. long], flying fish [i.e. feiyu], and “Big Dipper bull” [i.e. douniu]. Put the artisans to death and send their families to frontier garrisons as soldiers. People who wear them are to be punished without pardon

— Shen Dufu, Wanli yehuo bian [Unofficial Gleanings of the Wanli Era], translated version from the 2019 article "Wearing The Hat Of Loyalty: Imperial Power And Dress Reform In Ming Dynasty China" by Chen Buyun, p. 422

According to the Wanli yehuo bian (萬厲野獲編) by Shen Defu, eunuchs during this period were parading in the streets of the capital wearing mangfu and douniufu while women (especially wives of the elite class) were wearing embroidered robes with designs, such as the qilin, feiyu and zuomang (坐蟒; 'seated python') in front of the senior officials. According to Shen Dufu, the sumptuary laws were being trespassed and the fault was that of the Emperor who was failing at regulating the possession robes adorned with imperial insignia.

During the 16th year of Emperor Hongzhi (1504), the customs of bestowing mangfu to the Grand Secretariat began.

The Jiajing emperor also bestowed mangfu to prominent Daoist patriarchs several times during his reign. According to the Ming shi, in 1530, it was decreed that the Head of the jinyiwei had to wear a red-coloured mangfu or feiyufu with a wushamao (lit. 'black gauze hat') and a phoenix belt on sacrificial and ceremonial occasions.

In 1538, still under the rule of Emperor Jiajing, gradations of cifu also stipulated that only ministers from the first to third rank were allowed to wear mangyi, which consisted of the mangfu, the feiyu mangyi, and the douniu mangyi. The mang patterns on the clothing insignia were also gradated based on a particular rank; according to Shen Defu, the most valued form of mang pattern was the zuomang; other form of mang pattern which existed in his period also included the danmang (單蟒).

In 1578, Great Empress Dowager Li bestowed mangfu to Zhang Juzhen on behalf of the Emperor.

During the reign under Emperor Wanli, many mangfu were bestowed. According to Xie Zhaozhe in the Wu Za Zu (五雜俎; 'Five assorted offerings'), more than 10,000 eunuchs were wearing mangfu and jade belts in the Forbidden City. However, the mangfu did not become a common form of clothing.

=== Qing dynasty ===
==== As jifu and chaofu ====
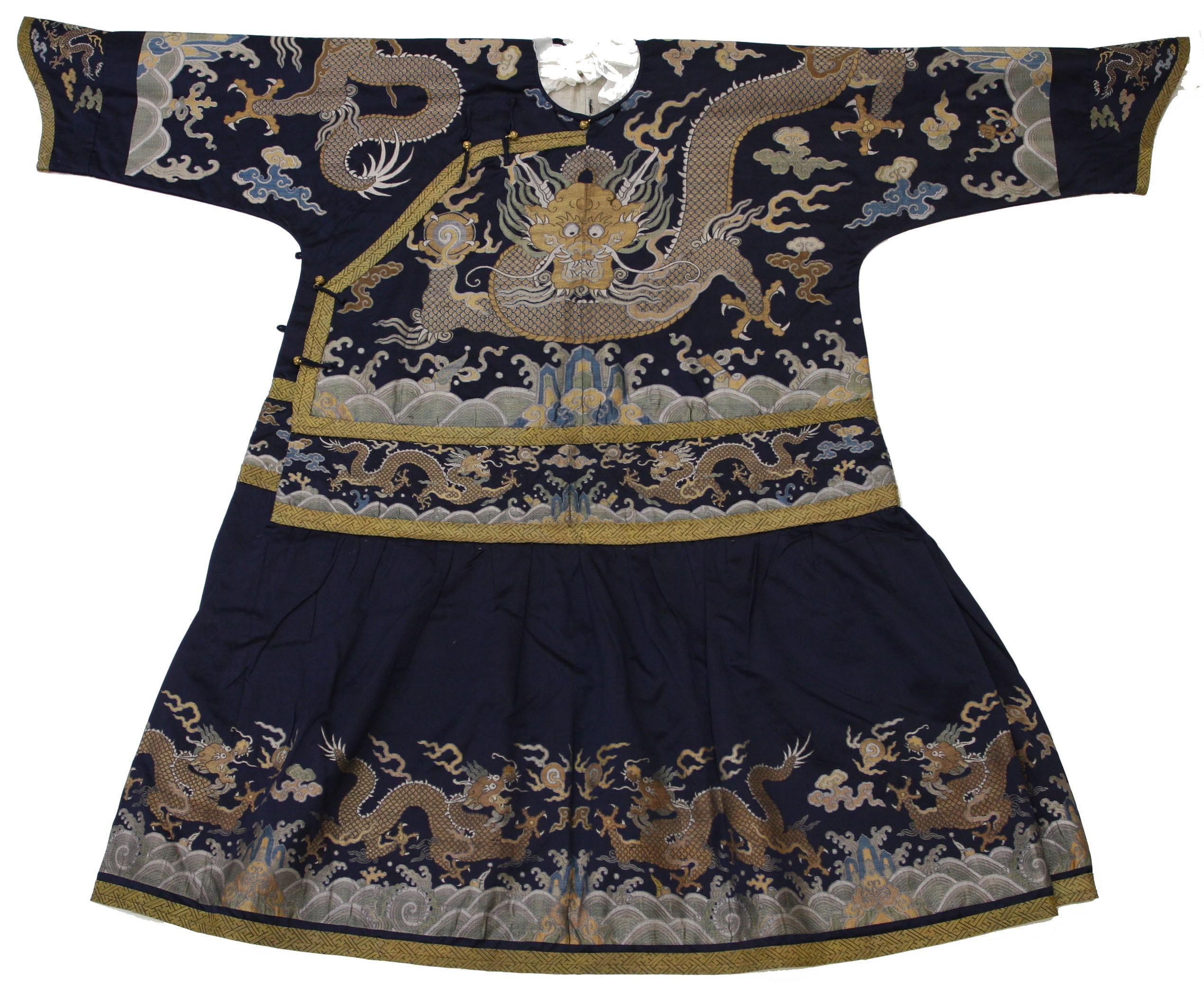
Chaofu with horse hoof-shaped cuff

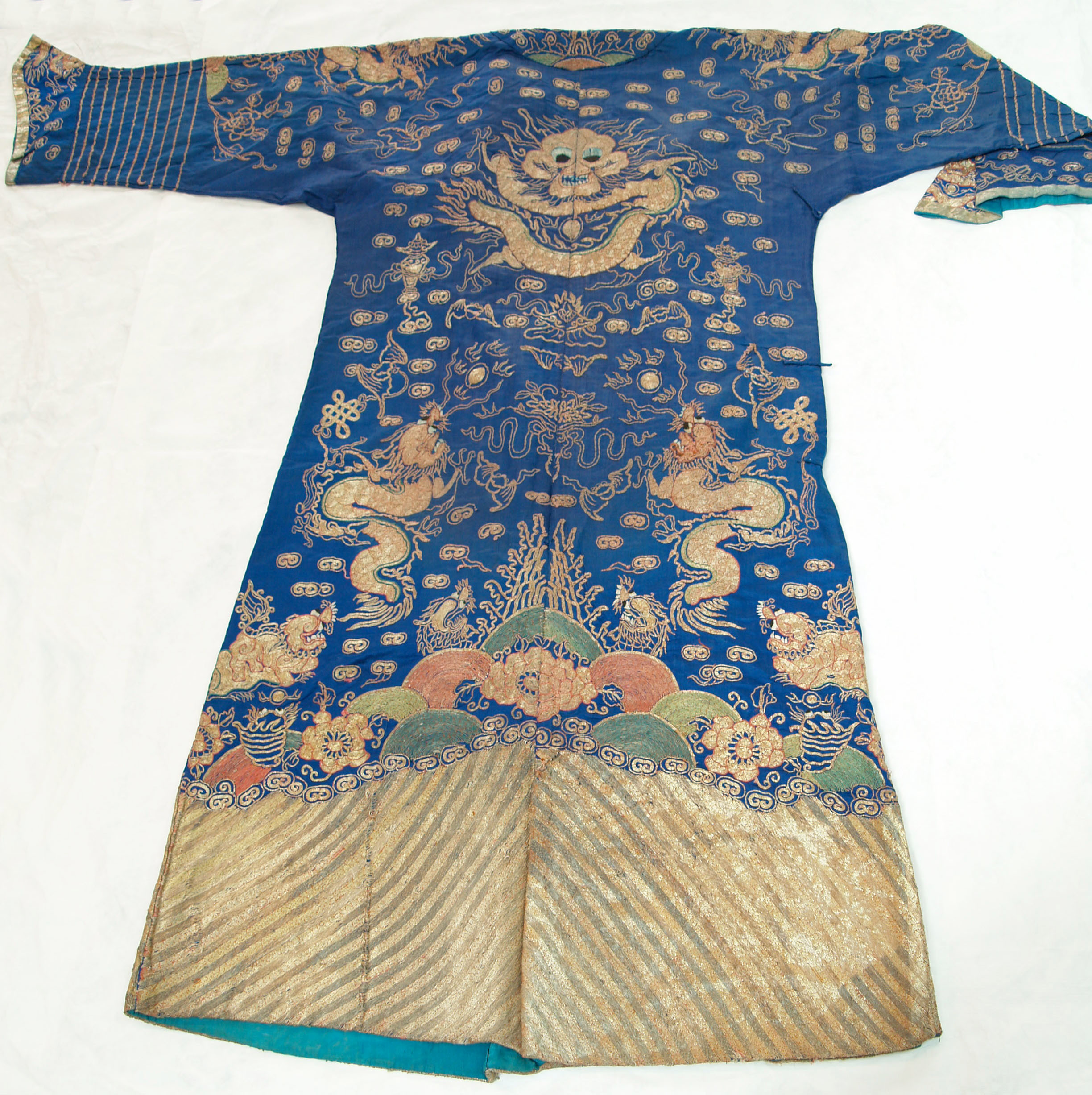
Jifu with horse hoof-shaped cuff

Types of mangfu worn by court officials, Qing dynasty

The mangfu continued to be worn in the Qing dynasty as part of the Qing dynasty official uniform (either as part of the jifu or as part of the chaofu) and continued to be worn by only those who were awarded by the Emperor.

The structure of the Manchu mangfu worn in the Qing dynasty differed from those worn in the Ming dynasty as the mangfu worn in the Qing dynasty was modified based on the early male clothing of the Manchu, thus retaining the original features while making new changes to the robes; for example, the Manchu mangfu had horse hoof-shaped cuff.

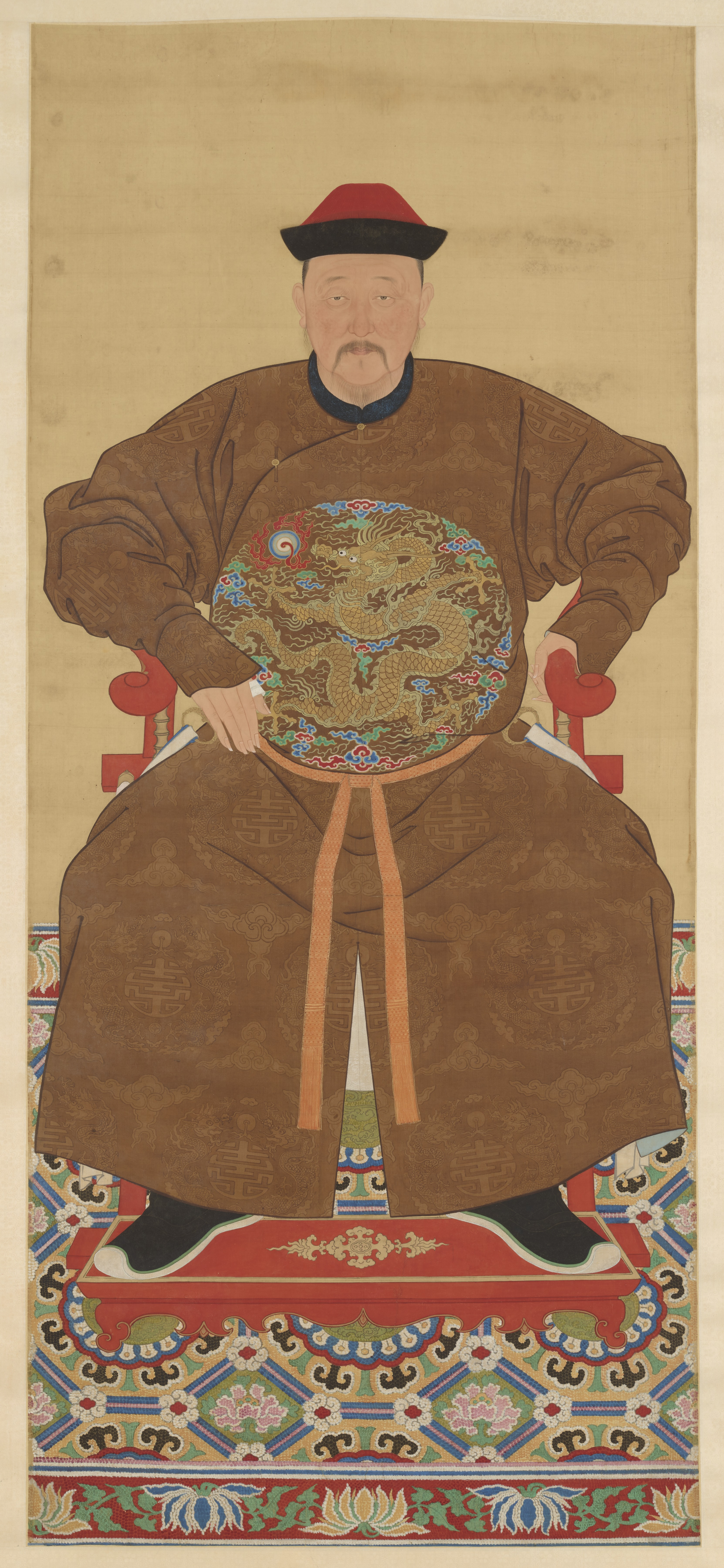
Portrait of Yintang (1683–1726)

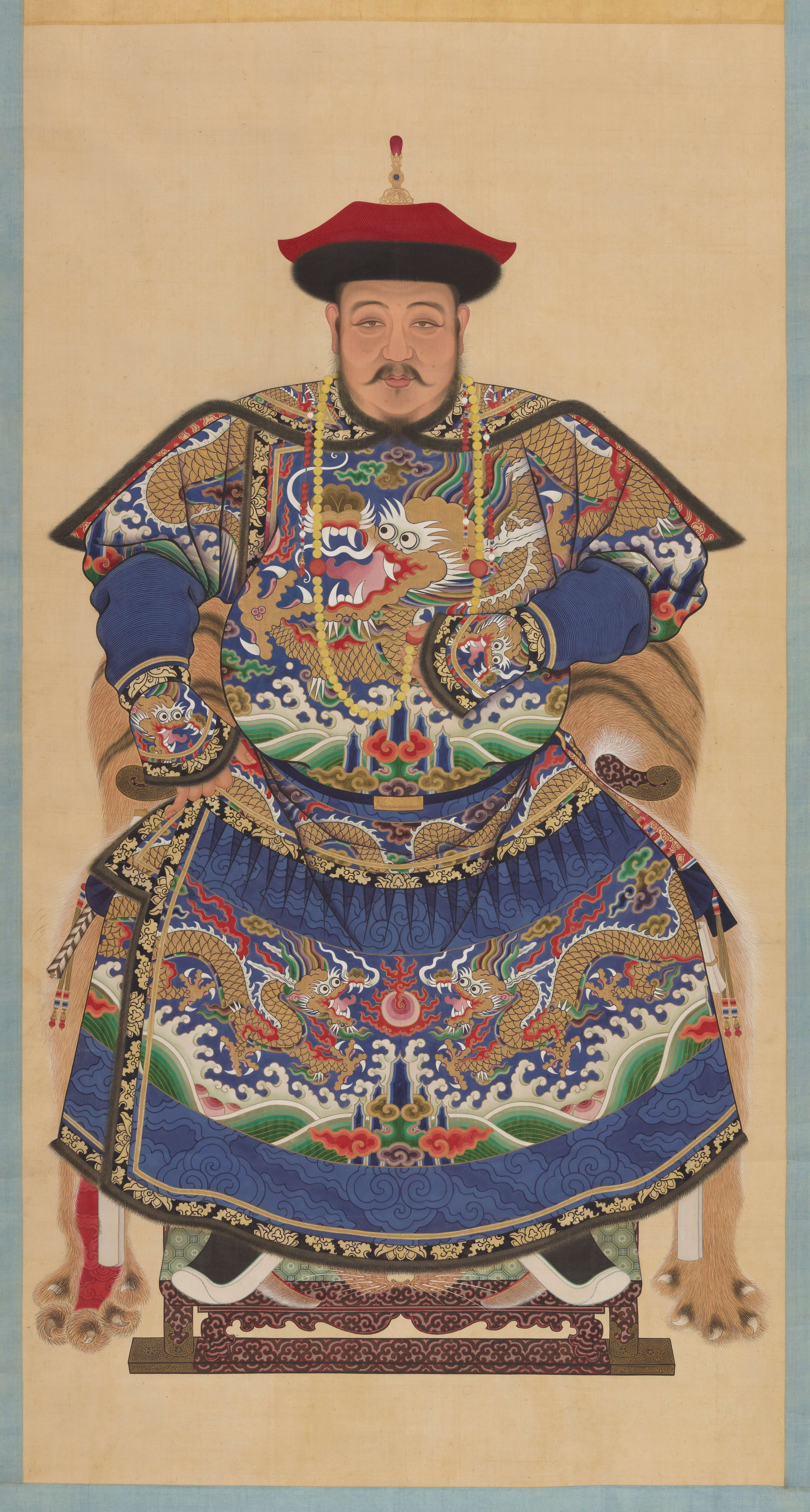
Qing courtier

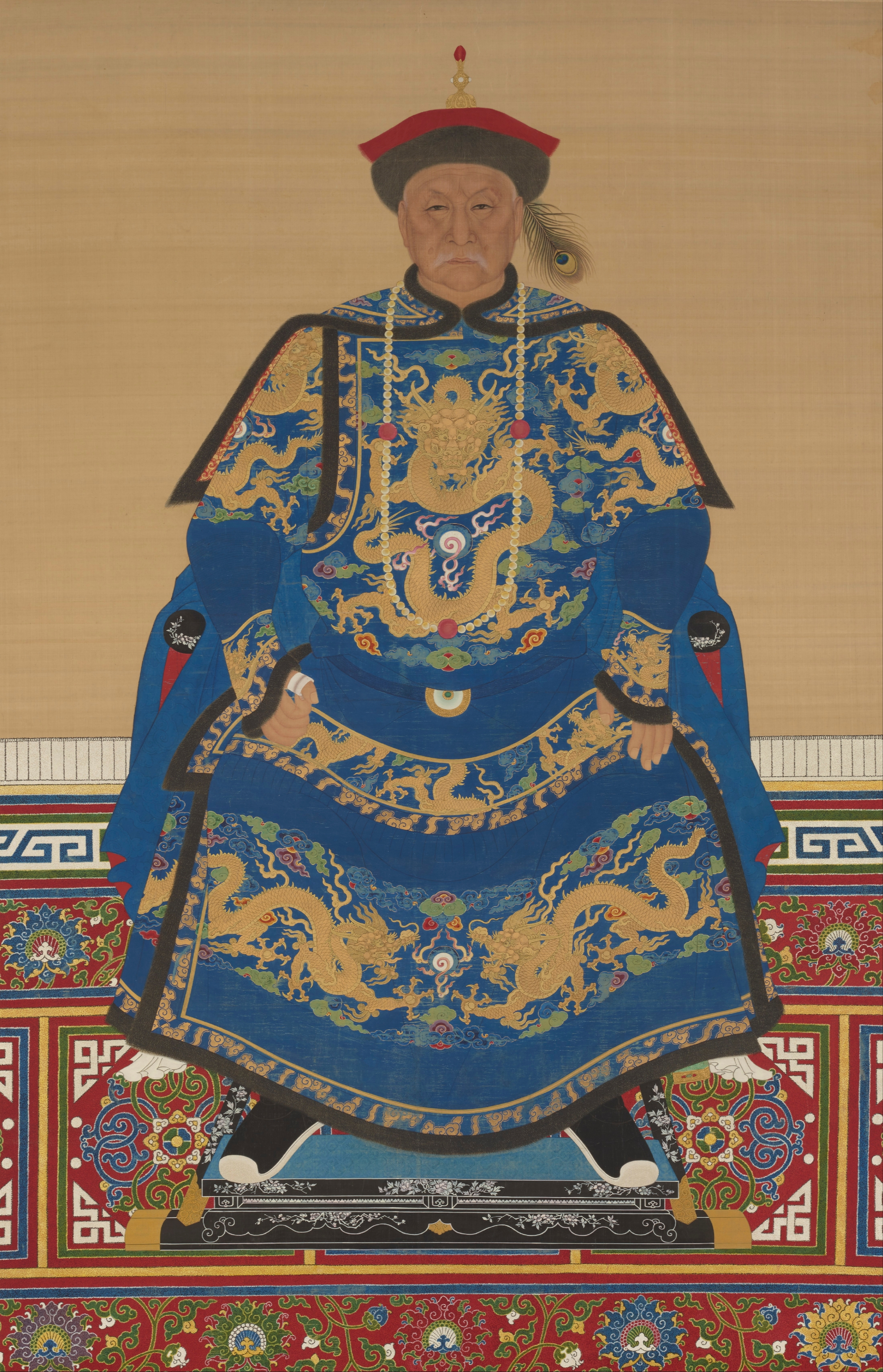
Portrait of Oboi.

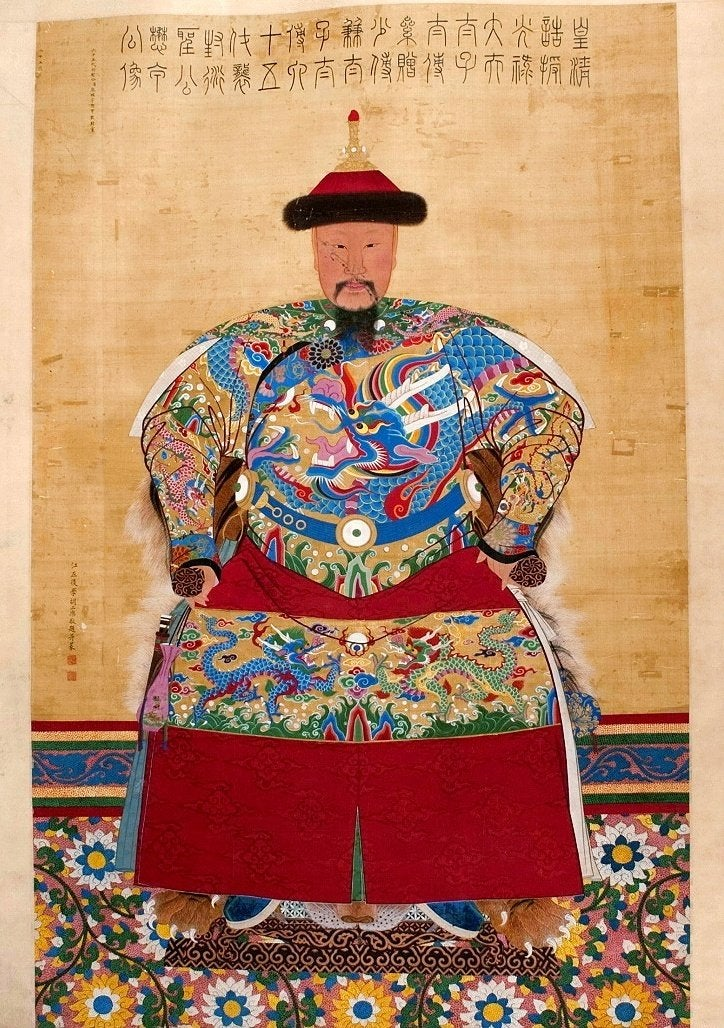
65th generation of Duke Yangsheng

==== Mang ao and Mang chu ====
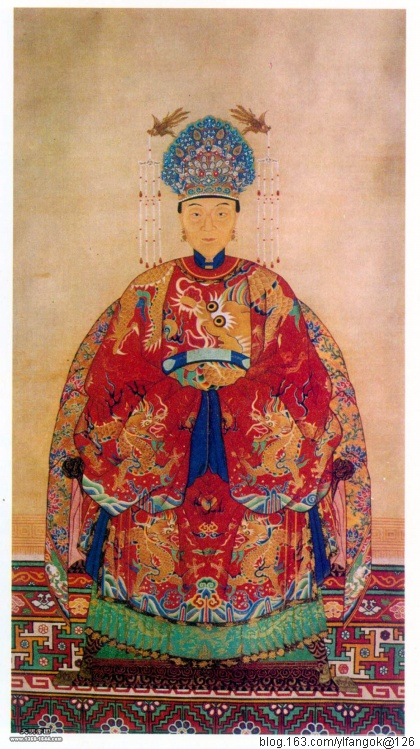
Wife of the 69th generation of Duke Yansheng, wearing mang ao and skirt

== Construction and design ==
There were also strict regulations on the robes' colour and the numbers of mang that were allowed to decorate the mangfu:

Characteristics of Court mangfu in the Qing dynasty
Rank		Number of mang	Stipulated colour
Crown prince		9	Apricot yellow
Princes		9	Golden
Civil and military officials	1st rank	9	Blue and azurite
Civil and military officials	2nd rank	9	Blue and azurite
Civil and military officials	3rd rank	9	Blue and azurite
Civil and military officials	4th rank	8	Blue and azurite
Civil and military officials	5th rank	8	Blue and azurite
Civil and military officials	6th rank	8	Blue and azurite
Civil and military officials	7th rank	5	Blue and azurite
Civil and military officials	8th rank	5	Blue and azurite
Civil and military officials	9th rank	5	Blue and azurite

== List of people bestowed with mangfu ==
- Liu Jian (劉健) (1433–1526), Grand Secretary from 1492 to 1513, was bestowed with a red mangfu.
- Li Dongyang (1447–1516), Grand Secretary from 1494 to 1513, was bestowed with a red mangfu.
- Xie Qian (1450–1531), Grand Secretary from 1495 to 1506 and from 1527 to 1528, was bestowed with a red mangfu.
- Shao Yuanjie (1450–1531), a Daoist patriarch, was bestowed a mangfu with a jade belt by Emperor Jiajing in 1536.
- Zhang Juzhen (1525–1582), a Ming dynasty imperial tutor and senior grand secretary; the mangfu were also bestowed to Zhang Juzhen's parents as a symbol of extreme favour.

== Theatrical costumes ==
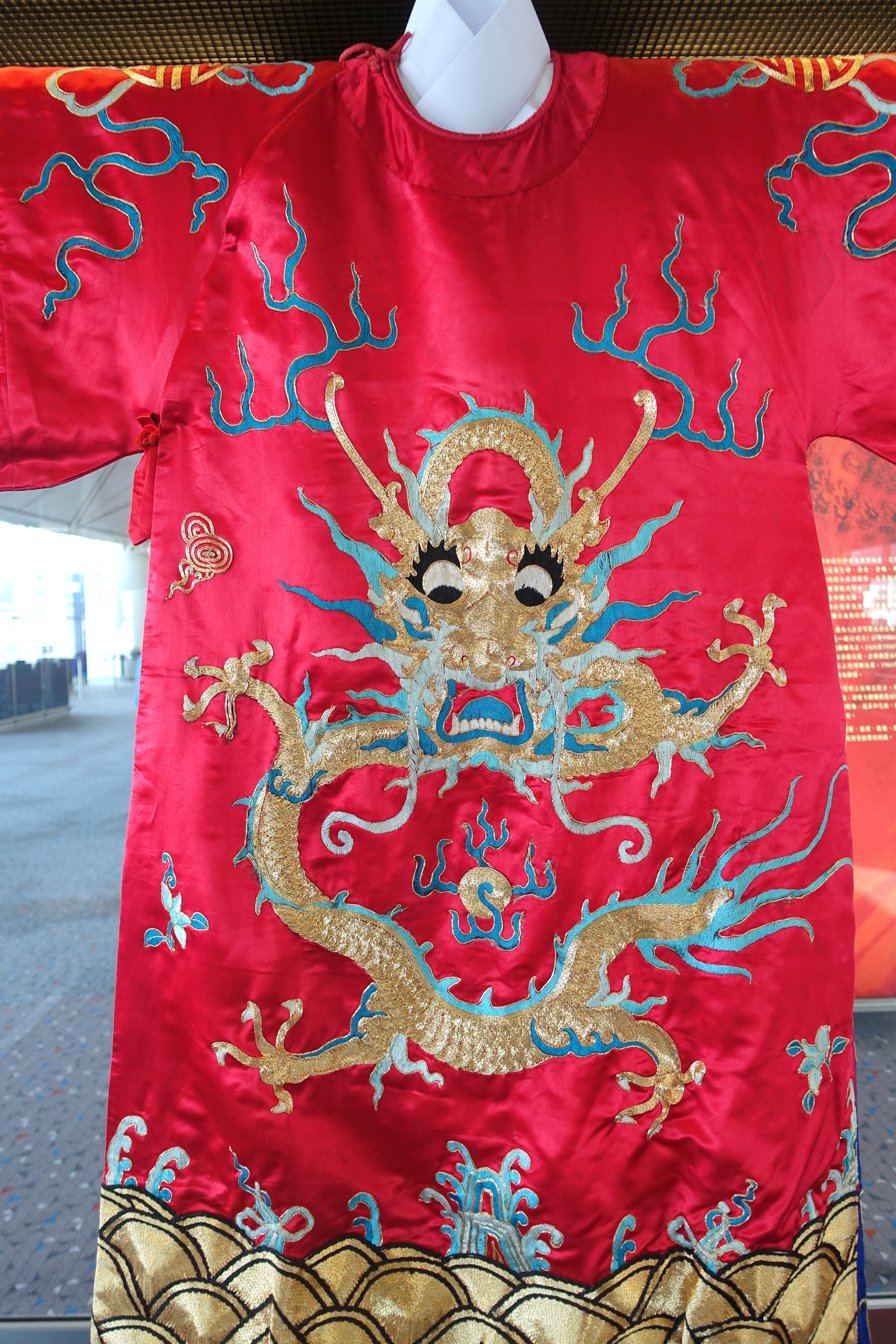
A red theatrical mangfu used as xifu in Cantonese opera

The xifu, Chinese opera costumes, were made based on the clothing style of the Ming dynasty while also absorbing clothing features of the Song, Yuan, and Qing dynasties. On stage, the theatrical mangfu is typically in the appearance of a yuanlingpao.

In Chinese opera, the theatrical mangfu is the highest of formal, ceremonial robe worn by performers in the roles of emperors, princes, officials (ministers for specific occasions, such as court audience), and generals.

The theatrical mangfu has a male and female version; the mangfu patterns on the robes vary and can be found in: mang medallions, front-viewed mang and flying dragon.

When decorated with flying dragon patterns, the robe is typically also decorated with patterns of waves and mountain peaks. There is also strict regulations on the colours used in the theatrical mangfu; the colours are divided into "upper five colours" and "lower five colours", minghuang (bright yellow) colour is exclusively reserved for imperial usage. Other colours included: red.

=== In Beijing opera ===
In Beijing opera, the mangfu xifu is known as Mang. The Mang is used to represent the emperor have a dragon with an open mouth, while the dragon used on the Mang of the ministers and generals have their mouth closed. The dragons looked bold and mighty when used on the Mang of martial officials but gentle and quiet when used in the Mang of civil officials. There is also other kind of Mang which are specially made for female actresses, laodan, and palace eunuchs.

The colours used in the Mang also have clear symbolism: red means majestic and noble; green means mighty and bold; white represents handsome young people; black is used to represent people who are upright and unconstrained.

=== Subtypes ===
- Jianmang (lit. 'Arrow python robe') – A mangfu in the style of a yuanlingpao for the role of Emperor Zhu Di of Ming invented by Ma Lianliang; it is the combination of an arrow robe and a python robe.

== Depictions in entertainment media and literature ==
- Chinese opera
- Jin Ping Mei

== Similar clothing ==
- Jisün
- Terlig
- Yesa
- Feiyufu
- Douniufu
- Dragon robe

== See also ==
- Chinese ornamental gold silk
- Hanfu
- List of hanfu
