= Chinese opera costume =

Stage clothes used in Chinese opera

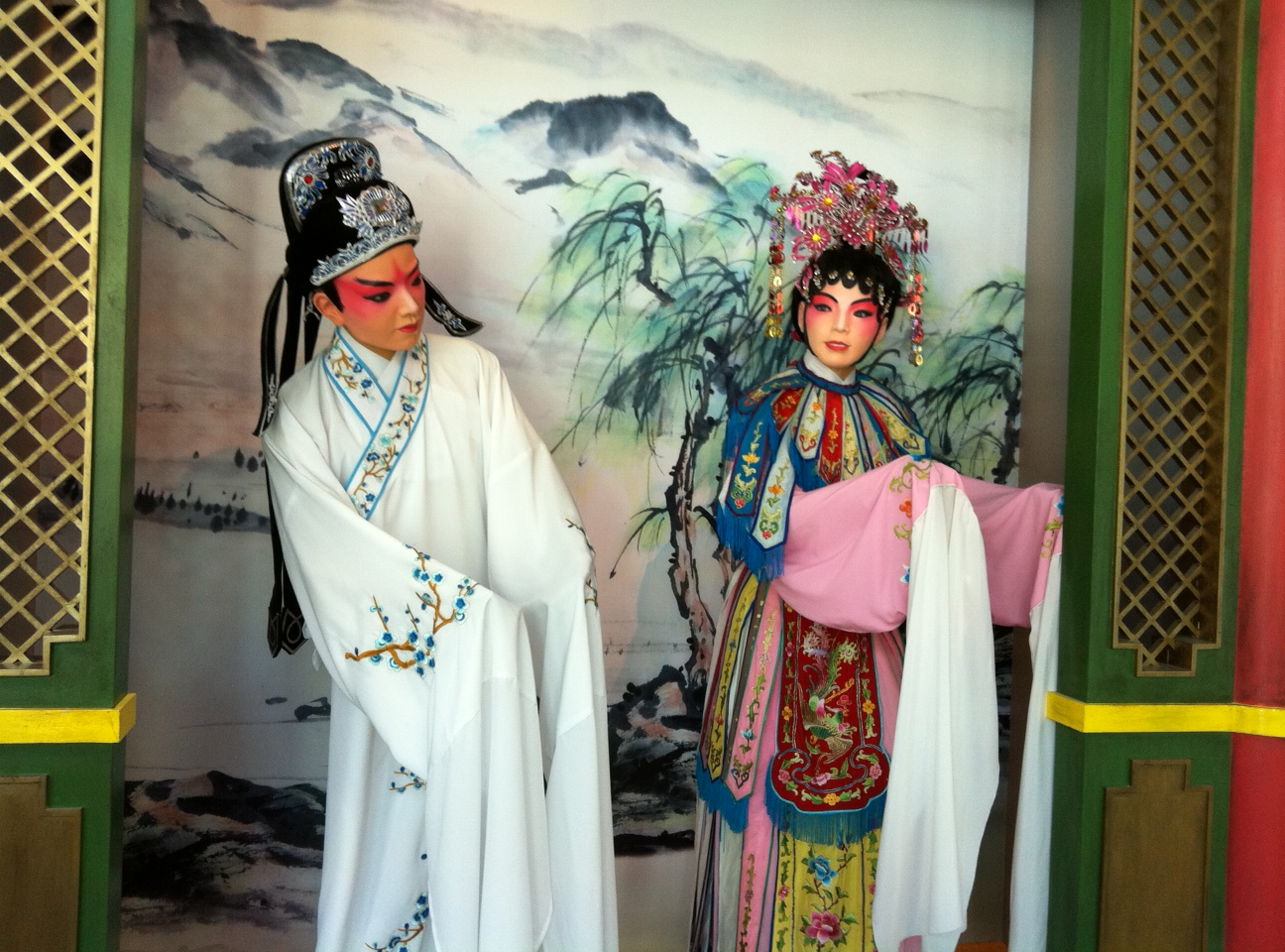

Chinese name
- Chinese: 戏服
Transcriptions
Standard Mandarin
- Hanyu Pinyin: Xìfú

English name
- English: Chinese opera costume

Xifu (Chinese: 戏服; pinyin: xìfú), also known as Chinese opera costume in English, are the stage clothes and attire worn in Chinese opera, such as Kunqu, Cantonese opera, Beijing opera, Huangmei opera. Some of these costumes bear some resemblance to the Hanfu system but also show some differences in terms of clothing ornaments and decorations, as well as colour system, and in design and construction. In 2006, the techniques used to produce Beijing opera costumes were included in the national intangible cultural heritage list.

== Beijing opera ==
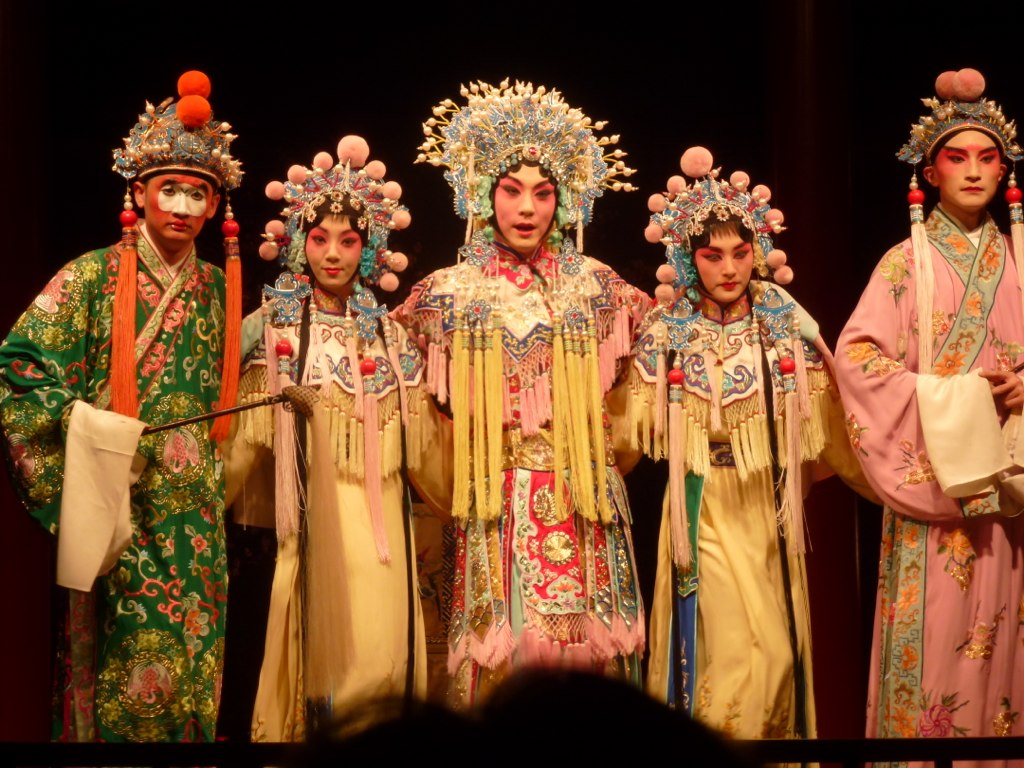
Beijing opera costumes, 2012.

Beijing opera was created in 1790 during the reign of the Qianlong Emperor in the Qing dynasty; however, the origins of its costumes can be traced back to the 14th century. The costumes were set in the Qing dynasty but its style mainly followed the Ming dynasty's hanfu-style clothing. They also absorbed some characteristics of the clothing style worn in the Song, Yuan, and Qing dynasties. Based on various forms of historical clothing, modifications were made to meet the needs of the play (including the singing and dancing movements of the actors).

Beijing opera costumes tend to be decorated with embroidery and exaggerated decorative patterns; the colours also tend to be bright. These costumes are crucial for the audience to understand the play. These costumes follow a social hierarchy (which includes nobles, the humbly born, civilians, military, official or private citizens); they also feature special ornamental patterns and decorations which are crucial in differentiating social class of the characters. The costumes also allow the audience to distinguish a character's sex. They also use subtle differences to distinguish between loyal and wicked characters. Since the costumes used is the same regardless of seasons, the weather is described in every scene of the play and is indicated by the actors' movements rather than on his clothing.

There are 20 major types of costumes, which include: Mang, an informal robe that is generally used for the emperor, nobles, civil and military officials, etc.; (Note: See page Mangfu for more details on the subtle differences which can exist in the Mang costume of the Beijing opera.) pi; kao (an armor, which is used for soldiers), xuezi. Some costumes were also designed by Mei Lanfang, which include guzhuang and the yuntai zhuang (cloud terrace costume).

== Cantonese opera ==
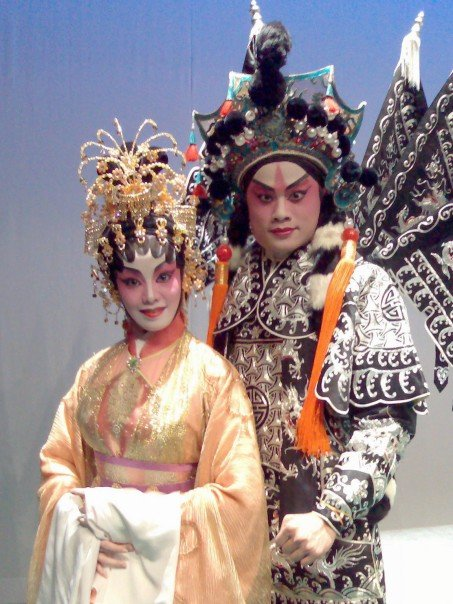
Cantonese opera costumes

Most Cantonese opera costumes are derived from the clothing style of the Ming dynasty, except for some which are based on the clothing of the Qing dynasty. When depicting plays that are set in all other dynasties except the Qing dynasty, Ming-style costumes are used. The Qing-style costumes are only used when the plays are set in the Qing dynasty.

The standards which are used to indicate particular roles or characters through the wearing of costumes are not as strict as those in Beijing opera. The costumes are typically specific to a general role and a character type, but they are rarely used to represent a specific character. The clothing can be divided into civil and military where the sleeves indicate if the character is civil or military. (Note: In Cantonese opera, the civil costumes use wide sleeves while the military costumes use tight sleeves.) Colours are also used to indicate the role and character type.

Cantonese opera costumes include the fan gongzhuang and haiqing. (Note: The haiqing used in Cantonese opera costume is a scholar's long robe which has a jiaoling youren front and wide sleeves.) Water sleeves were rarely used before World War II.

== Huangmei opera ==
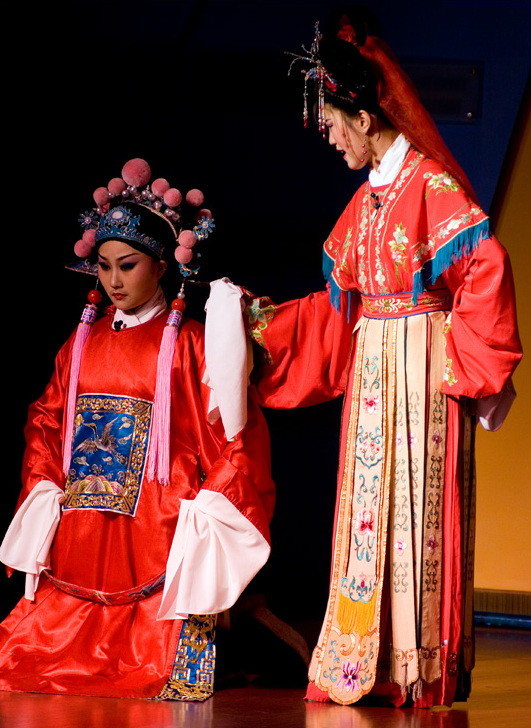
Costumes worn in a Huangmei opera

Huangmei opera costumes typically use ancient-style garments as most plays are based on Chinese folk tales.

== Kunqu ==
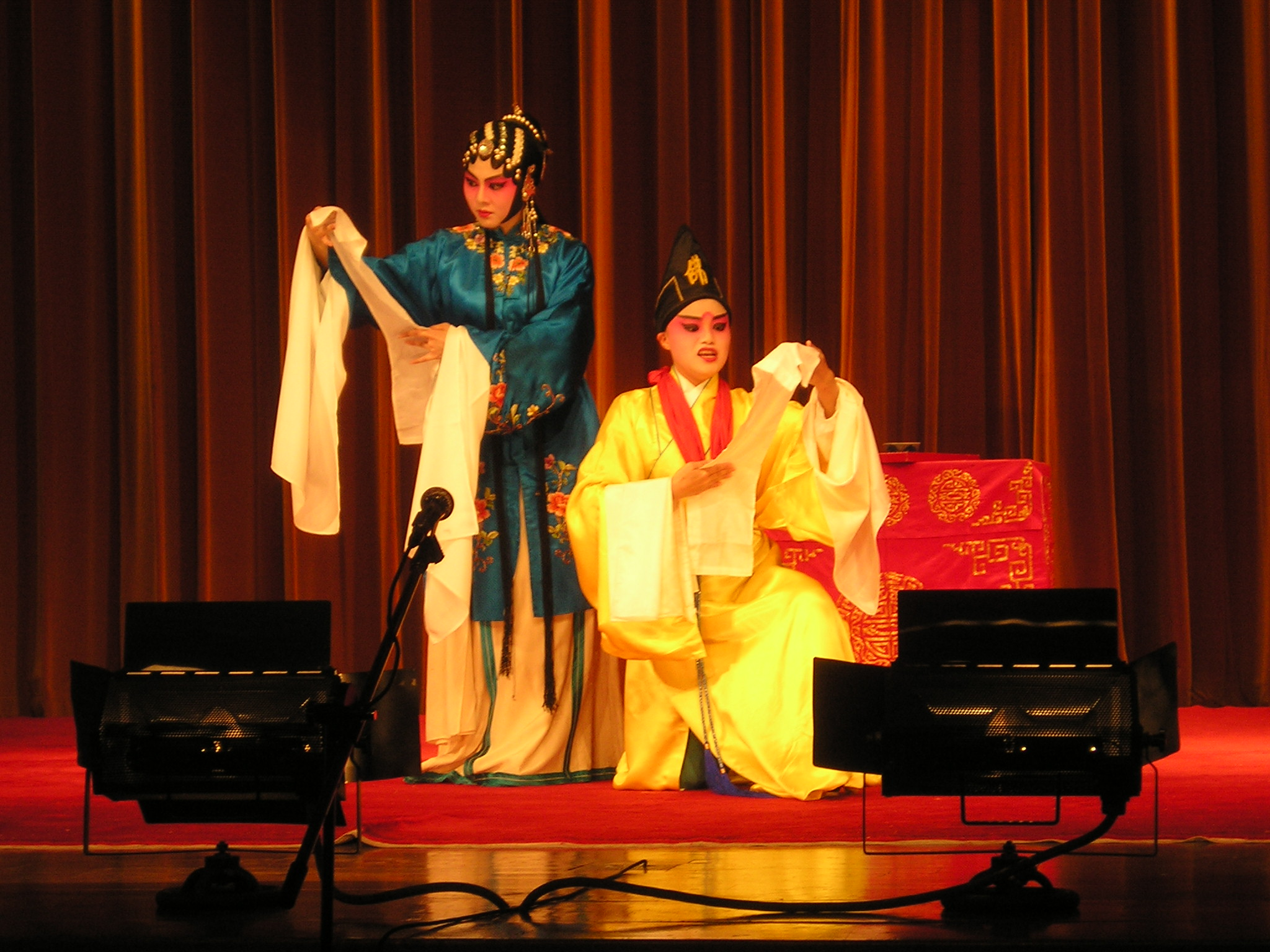
Costumes in Kunqu opera

Kunqu opera costumes are also based on the clothing style of the Ming dynasty; however, this historical clothing were modified to turn it into a more elaborate and exaggerated version.

The decorations used on the costumes are simple but they often give information about the character's personality; for example, peonies on the robe of a young man may indicate that he is a playboy. Water sleeves are also used in Kunqu opera to accentuate the actors' dance movements.

== Types of xifu ==
Types of xifu
Category	List
Set of attire	Aoku (also called kuao): (Note: See Ye (2020), pp. 34; Bonds (2008), pp. 168-169) consisting of an upper garment called ao and a pair of trousers called ku.; Aoqun (also called qunao): (Note: See Ye (2020), pp. 34; Bonds (2008), pp. 168-169) consisting of an upper garment called ao and a skirt called qun. It can be worn by a huadan.; Gongzhuang (lit. 'Palace garment'): (Note: See Bonds (2008), pp. 326) worn by actors performing the role of princesses and consorts.; Guzhuang
Robes	Mang; Xuezi/ Haiqing
Upper garments	Ao (Note: See Ye (2020), pp. 34; Bonds (2008), pp. 168-169); Beixin/ kanjian/ majia/ beida; Pi/ Nüpi; Shuitianyi
Lower garments	Ku: (Note: See Ye (2020), pp. 34; Bonds (2008), pp. 168-169) trousers; Qun: (Note: See Ye (2020), pp. 34; Bonds (2008), pp. 168-169) skirts; includes mamianqun
Armour	Kao
Accessories	Lingzi (Chinese: 翎子); Water sleeves

== Gallery ==
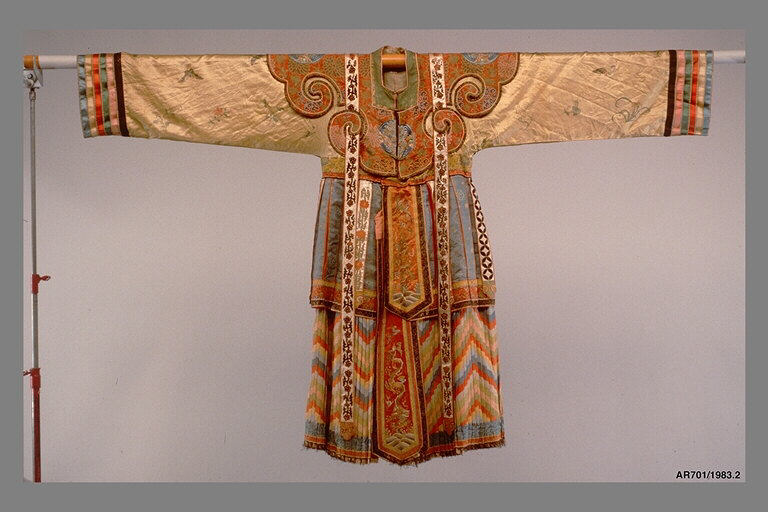

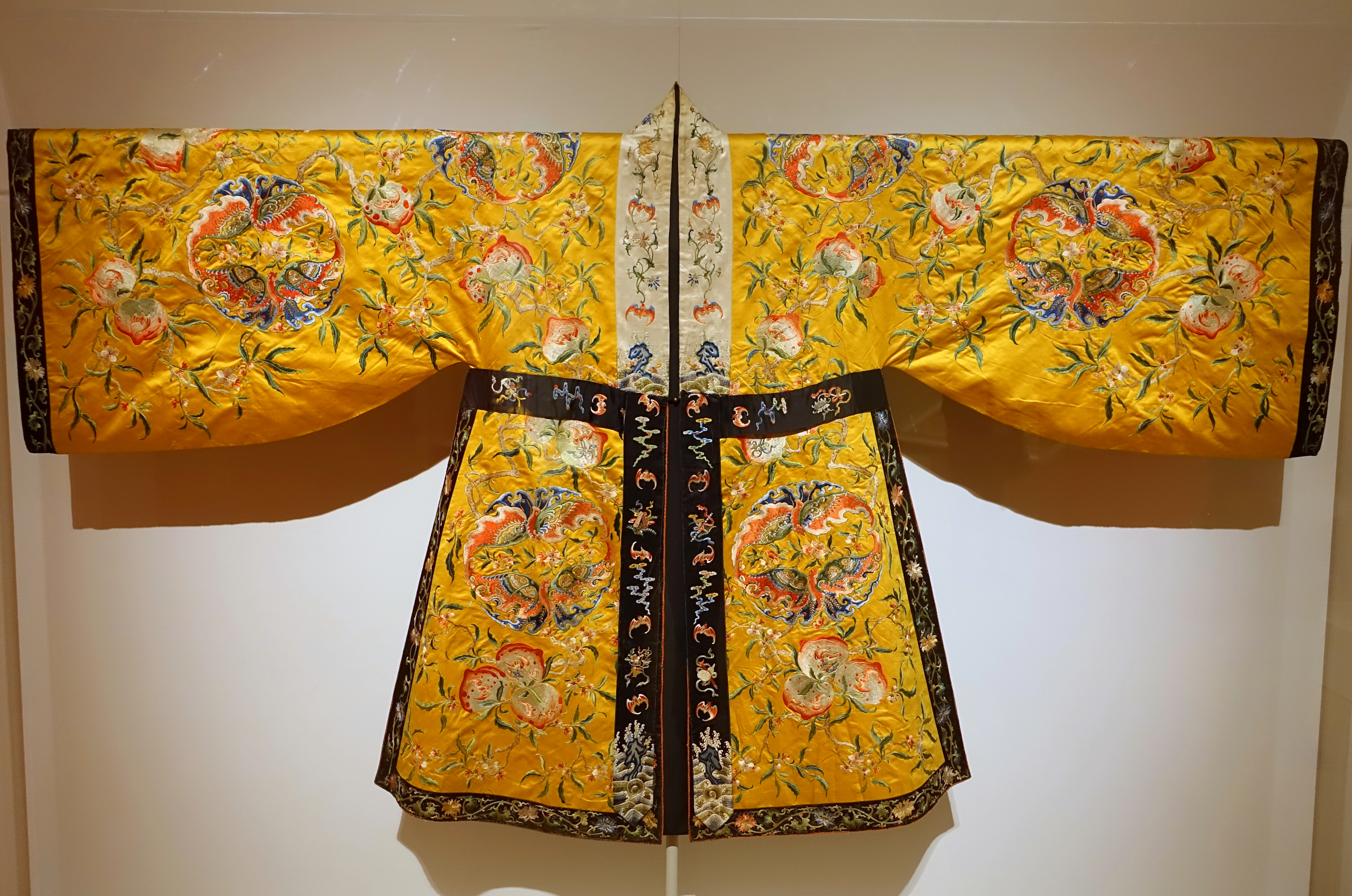

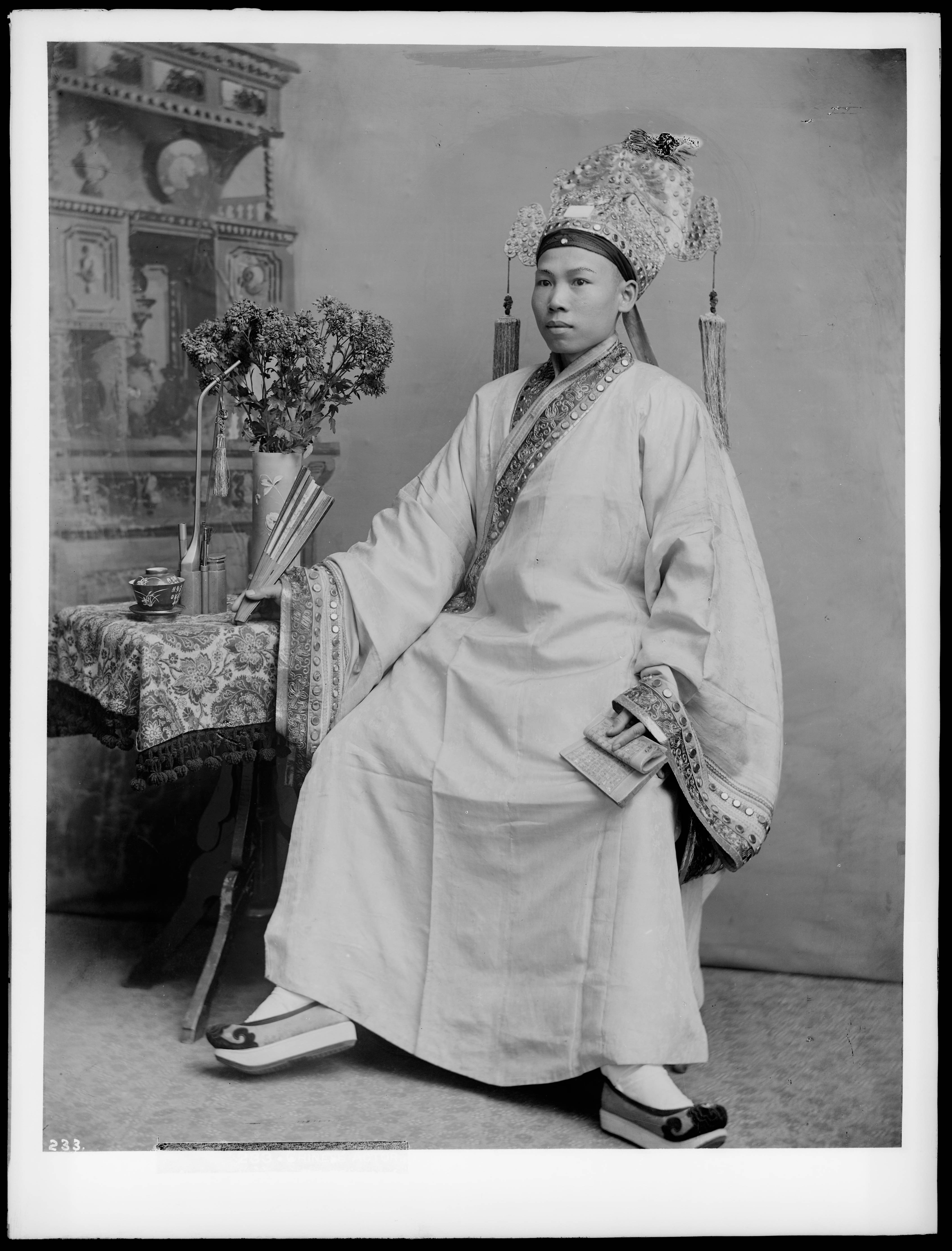

== See also ==
- Hanfu
- Guzhuang
- Qizhuang
- Chinese opera
