= Water sleeves =

Cuffs of costumes in Chinese opera

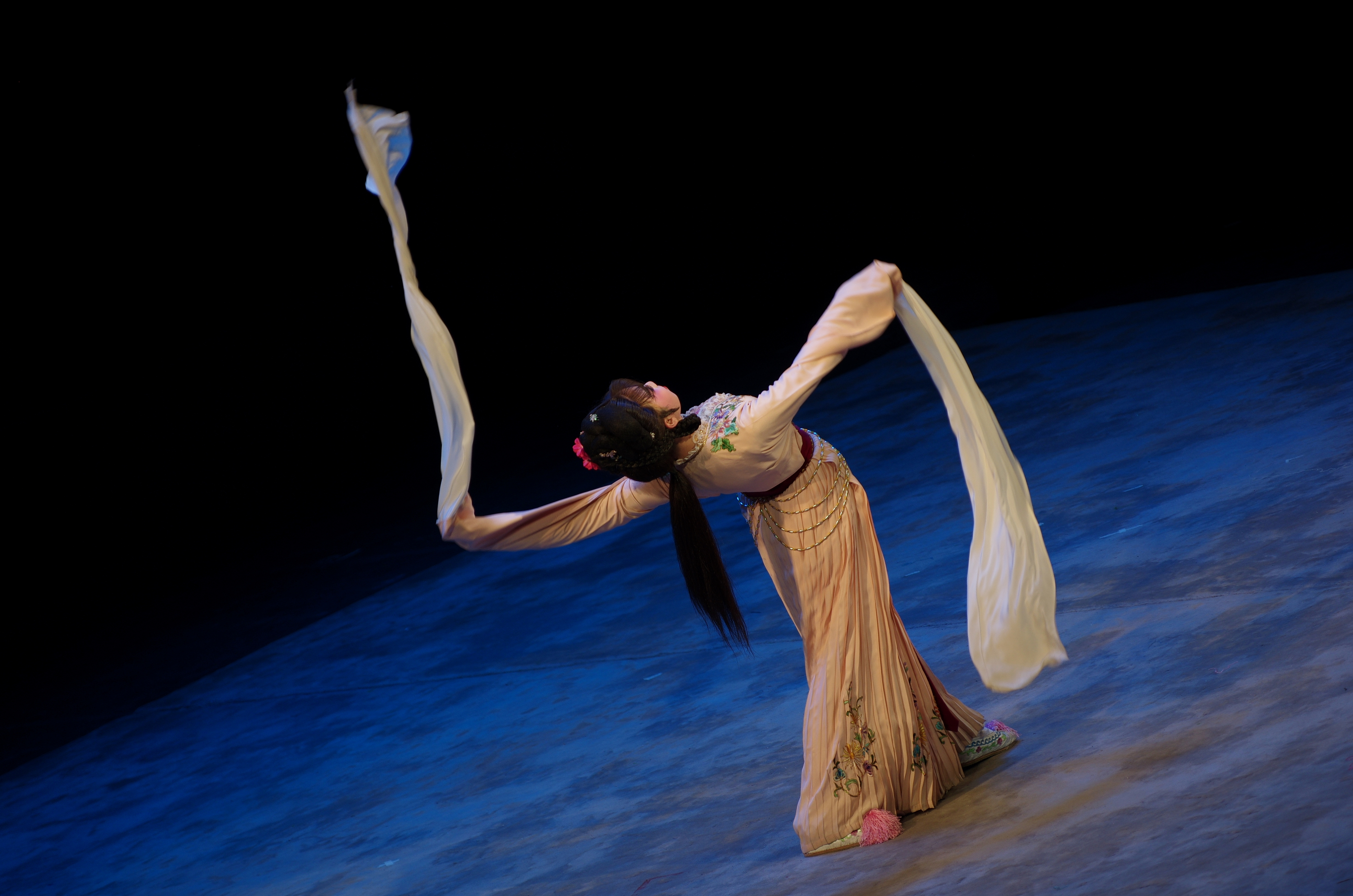
A Yue opera actress dancing with water sleeves

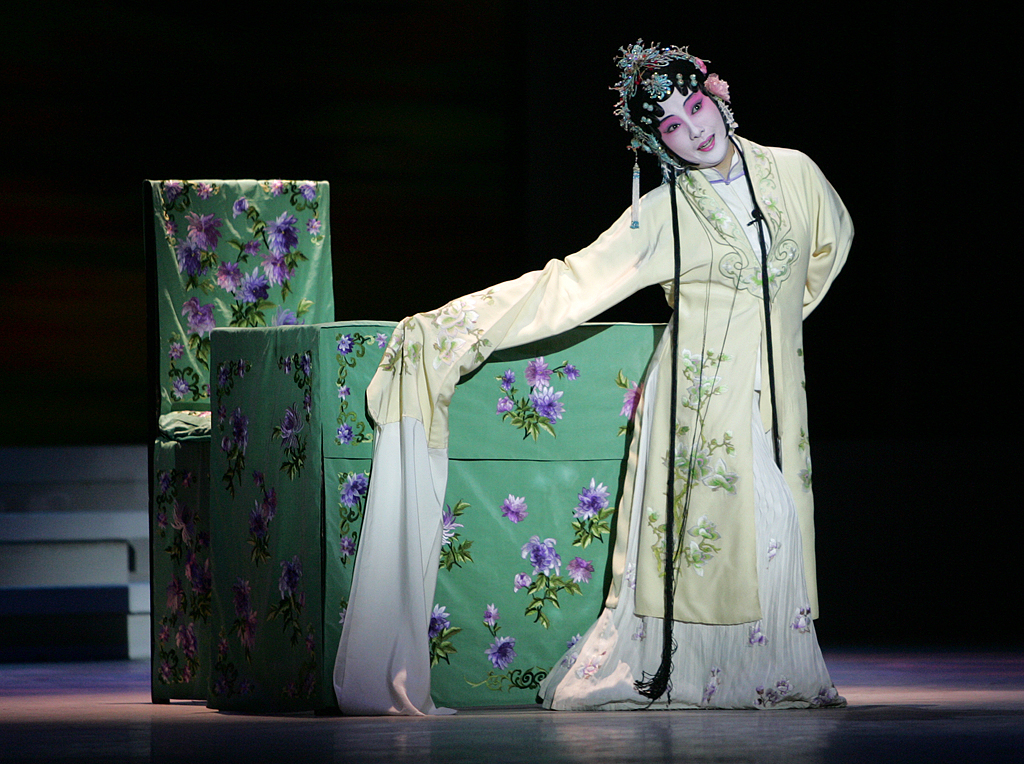
A Kunqu actress with an extended water sleeve

Water sleeves (Chinese: 水袖; pinyin: shuǐxiù) are long, flowing silk sleeve extensions attached to the cuffs of costumes in Chinese opera, widely used by both male and female characters of higher social classes. They originated as part of traditional performance arts and serve to enhance the expressiveness of gestures, symbolizing emotions and adding visual elegance to movements. Water sleeves have become integral in Chinese classical dance, blending cultural tradition with modern artistic innovations, and remain a symbol of China's rich performing arts heritage.

== History ==
The history of water sleeves in Chinese performance art reflects centuries of cultural and theatrical evolution. While long and flowing sleeves were already prevalent in imperial China, symbolizing grace, authority, and elegance, their origins can be traced back to the Han dynasty. Sleeve movements during this time were integral to early ritualistic and court dances. Han dynasty records highlight performances emphasizing slender waists and long, flowing sleeves, which symbolized feminine elegance and were used in ceremonial contexts. This period also saw the development of techniques that combined waist flexibility with flowing sleeve movements, laying the foundation for later artistic and symbolic innovations.

By the Tang dynasty, the incorporation of flowing garments into court dances further refined the aesthetic groundwork for water sleeves. Tang court dances celebrated grace and fluidity, with poetic depictions likening the sleeves' movements to the natural elements. These stylistic elements began to influence theatrical storytelling, particularly in operatic forms.

By the Song dynasty, sleeve movements became more stylized, enhancing dramatic expression in opera and dance performances. This era saw the beginnings of water sleeves as a theatrical device, with performers using the extensions to amplify emotional and narrative depth. Techniques for manipulating sleeves to resemble natural elements, such as water and clouds, began to take shape.

During the Ming dynasty, water sleeves became an integral part of Chinese opera, particularly in Kunqu and other regional operatic forms. They evolved from practical garment extensions, originally designed to protect the cuffs of clothing, into artistic tools made of fine silk. The Ming era solidified the visual and symbolic role of water sleeves, with their rippling movements likened to flowing water, enhancing the emotional resonance of performances.

In the Qing dynasty, water sleeves reached their peak in artistry and refinement, particularly within Peking opera. Performers developed intricate techniques such as flicking, twirling, and casting the sleeves, using them to signify emotions ranging from joy and sorrow to elegance and power. The symbolic meanings of water sleeves also deepened, representing virtues like modesty and grace, or amplifying dramatic tension in scenes of conflict or despair.

The 20th century witnessed a renewed focus on water sleeves through the formalization of Chinese classical dance. Dance pioneers adapted water sleeve techniques for modern choreography, emphasizing their aesthetic and rhythmic qualities. Innovations during this period included blending traditional opera movements with contemporary dance elements, transforming water sleeves into a versatile symbol of Chinese cultural heritage.

== Differences between water sleeves in Peking opera and classical dance ==
In Peking opera, water sleeves are a narrative and symbolic tool. Their movements align with the character’s personality and emotions, with highly stylized gestures used to express inner states. For example, light, flowing motions often represent grace or gentleness, while more forceful gestures signal tension or power.

In Chinese classical dance, water sleeves are integrated into the dancer's physical expression and body rhythm. The focus is on visual fluidity, using techniques like flicking, thrusting, and twirling to emulate natural elements such as rippling water or drifting clouds. Unlike opera, where movements are codified, classical dance explores dynamic and expansive motions that prioritize aesthetic beauty and emotional resonance.

== Techniques ==
Water sleeves are used to express elegance and emotions, whose techniques require years of rigorous training to master. The most common basic water sleeves skills (Chinese: 水袖功) include the transition sleeve, the aside sleeve, the hiding sleeve, the angry sleeve, the sending-away sleeve, the female greeting sleeve, the male greeting sleeve, the dusting sleeve, the signifying sleeve, the decision sleeve, the sheltering sleeve, the running sleeve, the weeping sleeve, the friendly sleeve, the beginning sleeve, the alerting sleeve, the masculine sleeve, and the ghost sleeve. In general, water sleeves can emphasize the movements of the arms and hands, such as pointing to an object. They are also used to cover the face when crying, eating or laughing. When water sleeves are in repose, skillful performers will fold them in accordion pleats on the forearms with a few flicks of the wrists.

== Variation ==
Nowadays, the longest water sleeves are found in Jilin opera, and the shortest in Sichuan opera.

The longest water sleeves can reach 300 cm (3 meters / 10 feet) or more. Some professional dance troupes have custom sleeves up to 5 meters (16 feet).

Length	Typical Use
150–200 cm (5–6.5 ft)	Regular maximum for professional classical dancers
200–300 cm (6.5–10 ft)	Grand finale pieces on major stages
300–500 cm (10–16 ft)	Rare, master-level solo performances only
500 cm+ (16 ft+)	Guinness World Record level, not practical

Sleeves over 200 cm require exceptional core strength and years of training to control. For most professional dancers, 100–150 cm is the practical sweet spot.

== See also ==
- Bell sleeve
- Chinese opera
- Chinese opera costume
- Dance in China
- List of dance in China
