= Chai =

Chai most often refers to:

- Chai, a word for tea in numerous languages
- Masala chai, a blend of black tea and herbs and spices, originating in India
- Chai (symbol), the Hebrew word for life and prominent Jewish symbol

Chai or CHAI may also refer to:

== People ==
=== Names ===
- Chai (surname) (柴), a Chinese surname
- Chae, also romanized Chai, a Korean name
- Zhai (翟; Chai in Wade–Giles), a different Chinese surname

=== Individuals ===
- Chai (king of Ayutthaya) (ไชย), reigning for nine months in 1656
- Chai of Lan Na (ᨩᩣ᩠ᨿ), reigning from 1538 to 1543
- Chai Lee (active 1970s – 1990s), British actress
- Chai Patel (born 1954), British doctor and businessman
- Chai Vang (born 1968), American convicted mass murderer
- Naga Chaitanya (born 1986), Indian film actor; sometimes nicknamed Chai
- Lee Soo-jung (born 1993), Korean American singer also known by the stage name Chai

== Radio ==
- CHAI-FM, Canadian radio station
- ChaiFM, South African radio station
- Kol Chai, Israeli radio station

== Other uses ==
- Autosomal dominant CTLA‐4 haploinsufficiency with autoimmune infiltration (CHAI), a genetic disorder of the immune system
- Chai (band), a Japanese rock band
  - Chai (album), 2023, their final album
  - "Chai" (song), a 2013 single
- Chai (wine), a shed for storing casks
- Center for Human-Compatible Artificial Intelligence (CHAI), an AI safety research center
- Clinton Health Access Initiative (CHAI), a health organization focusing on the developing world
- Commission for Healthcare Audit and Inspection (CHAI, 2004–2009), a UK non-departmental public body
- Chai AI, an AI platform
- Chai, a generic name for Chinese hairpin
- "Hi" (Ofra Haza song) (or "Chai"), 1983

== See also ==
- Chay (disambiguation)
- Chia (disambiguation)
- HAI (disambiguation)
- Jai (disambiguation)
