= Chay =

Chay may refer to:

== Places ==
- Chay, Doubs, a commune in eastern France
- Chay, Russia, a rural locality (selo) in Vilyuysky District, Sakha Republic, Russia

== People ==
- Chay (given name)
- Chay Weng Yew (1928–2004), Singaporean weightlifter
- Jean-Yves Chay (born 1948), French football manager
- Chay Wai Chuen (born 1950), Singaporean politician
- Chay Yew (born 1965), American playwright
- Mark Chay (born 1982), Singaporean swimmer
- Chesster Chay (born 1989), Filipino actor
- Chay (footballer) (Chayene Medeiros Oliveira Santos; born 1990), Brazilian footballer
- Naga Chaitanya (born 1986), Indian actor, nicknamed Chay

== Other uses ==
- CHAY-FM, a Canadian radio station based in Ontario
- Chay, a name for tea in several languages
- Chay, an alternative name for chaise
- Chay root (Oldenlandia umbellata), used as a source of red pigment

== See also ==
- Chai (disambiguation)
- Chaya (disambiguation)
