= Chay (given name) =

Male given name

- Gender: Male or Female

Origin
- Origin: Gaelic
- Meaning: "Fairy Tale"

Other names
- Related names: Charles, Chaise

Chay is a masculine name. It is either a diminutive of Charles, ultimately derived from Germanic Karal, Karel, Karl, meaning “man”, or it may be Gaelic in origin, meaning “Fairy Tale”. This unusual name surfaced into the public in Britain in the mid-1970s, with the publicity for yachtsman Chay Blyth. It is generally pronounced Sh (as in Shane) ay (as in May) (/ʃeɪ/), and sometimes pronounced Ch (as in Charles) ay (as in May) (/tʃeɪ/).

Also an ancient word derived from the Old Testament meaning "And Yahweh will give you a son".

== See also ==
- Chay (disambiguation)
- Chal (name)
- Char (name)
- Charles
- Chaise
- Chay Blyth
- Shay (disambiguation)
- Chesster Chay
