= Chai (surname) =

Chai (Chinese: 柴; pinyin: Chái; Wade–Giles: Ch'ai, also spelled as Tsai, Tchai) is a Chinese surname. The same surname is Sài in Vietnamese, and Si (시, sometimes spelled as Shi, See, Sie, Sea) in Korean.

Chai is listed 325th in the Song dynasty classic text Hundred Family Surnames. As of 2008, it is the 127th most common surname in China, shared by 1.35 million people.

== Notable people ==
- Chai Shao (588–638), Chinese military general in the Tang Dynasty
- Chai Rong (921–959), Chinese emperor of the Later Zhou Dynasty
- Chai Zongxun (953–973), Chinese emperor of the Later Zhou Dynasty, Chai Rong's son
- Chai Zemin (1916–2010), Chinese diplomat
- Chai Songyue (born 1941), Chinese politician
- Makana Risser Chai (born 1953), American author and massage therapist
- Mark Chai (born 1954), Hawaiian-Chinese sculptor
- Chai Hui-chen (born c. 1955), Taiwanese general and politician
- Arlene J. Chai (born 1955), Filipino author
- Nelson Chai (born 1965), American businessman
- Chai Ling (born 1966), Chinese student leader in the 1989 Tian'anmen Square protests
- Chai Jing (born 1976), Chinese journalist and host
- Chai Biao (born 1990), Chinese badminton player

In fiction:

- Chai Jin, fictional character in the novel Water Margin, descendant of Chai Rong
- Chai Xianghua, fictional character in the Soulcalibur video game series

== See also ==
- Chai (disambiguation)
- Cai (surname) (蔡)
- Chal (name)
- Char (name)
- Qi (surname 齊)
