= Chai Hui-chen =

- 柴惠珍
- Other names: Tschai Hui-chen
- Citizenship: Taiwan
- Occupation: Major General
- Known for: Taiwan's first female combat-status general, Director General of the Information Assurance Division, Primary spokesperson for the MND on several intrusions
- Notable work: leads the Taiwan military in their information security efforts

Major General Chai Hui-chen (Chinese: 柴惠珍; pinyin: Chái Huìzhēn), sometimes referred to as Tschai Hui-chen or by her English name Jane, is Taiwan's first female combat-status general. She is currently the Director General of the Information Assurance Division in the Office of the Deputy Chief of the General Staff for Communications, Electronics & Information (J6) in Taiwan's Ministry of National Defense. As such, she is the person leading the Taiwan military in their information security efforts, and she is the primary spokesperson for the MND on several intrusions into MND military systems possibly originating in the People's Republic of China.

== Sources ==
- "Female general an IT whiz" (Taipei Times, Accessed 10/25/06)
- "Defense ministry warns personnel of hacker attacks" (Taipei Times, Accessed 08/03/07)
