= ChaiFM =

101.9 Chai FM
Johannesburg; South Africa
- Broadcast area: Greater Johannesburg
- Frequency: 101.9 FM

Programming
- Format: Jewish talk

Ownership
- Owner: JHB Jewish Community

History
- First air date: 9 December 2008

Links
- Website: www.chaifm.com

ChaiFM is a South African Jewish community radio station broadcasting to the greater Johannesburg area on 101.9 FM. It broadcasts 24 hours a day six days a week, taking a break from Friday night to Saturday night because of Shabbat.

== See also ==
- Melbourne Jewish Radio (Lion FM)
