= Chesster Chay =

- Born: Fredyryk Chesster Siason-Chay; August 21, 1989 (age 35); San Jose del Monte, Bulacan, Philippines
- Other names: Chay
- Occupation(s): Actor, Commercial model
- Years active: 2010–present

Fredyryk Chesster Siason-Chay, popularly known as Chesster Chay (born August 8, 1989, in San Jose del Monte, Bulacan, Philippines), is a television actor and commercial model who works in Filipino productions.

== Biography ==
Chay is the son of Alfredo Chay, and the brother of Chessander, and Chessandra Chay. Chay is currently seen. in the TV fantasy series Bantatay of GMA Network, as one of the performers in P.O.5 of TV5, and as a correspondent in 30w POwhz with Ryan Bang of ABS-CBN's affiliate station Studio 23. Working in three giant networks of the country ( GMA Network, TV5 and ABS-CBN ).

== Education ==
Chay is currently taking Bachelor of Science in Information Technology.

== Filmtography ==
=== Television ===
Year	Title	Role
2010–11	Willing Willie!	Himself/Host
2010–11	Bantatay	Chay Gates
2010–11	P.O.5	Himself/Performer
2010	30w POwhz	Himself/Correspondent
