= Hufu =

Generic term for non-Han Chinese clothing

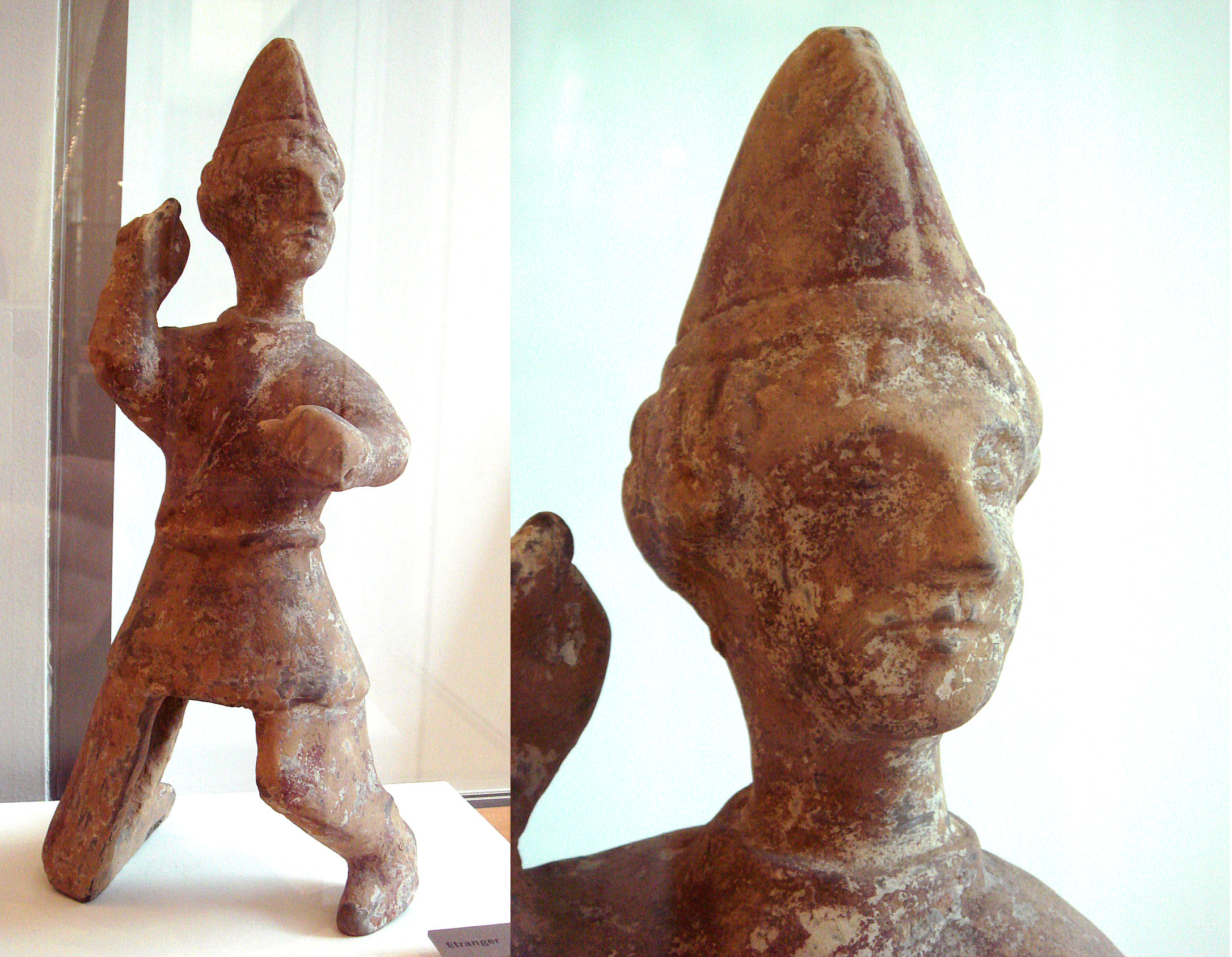
- A foreign Sogdian soldier wearing a curved collar (曲领) short robe, Eastern Han, early 3rd century.

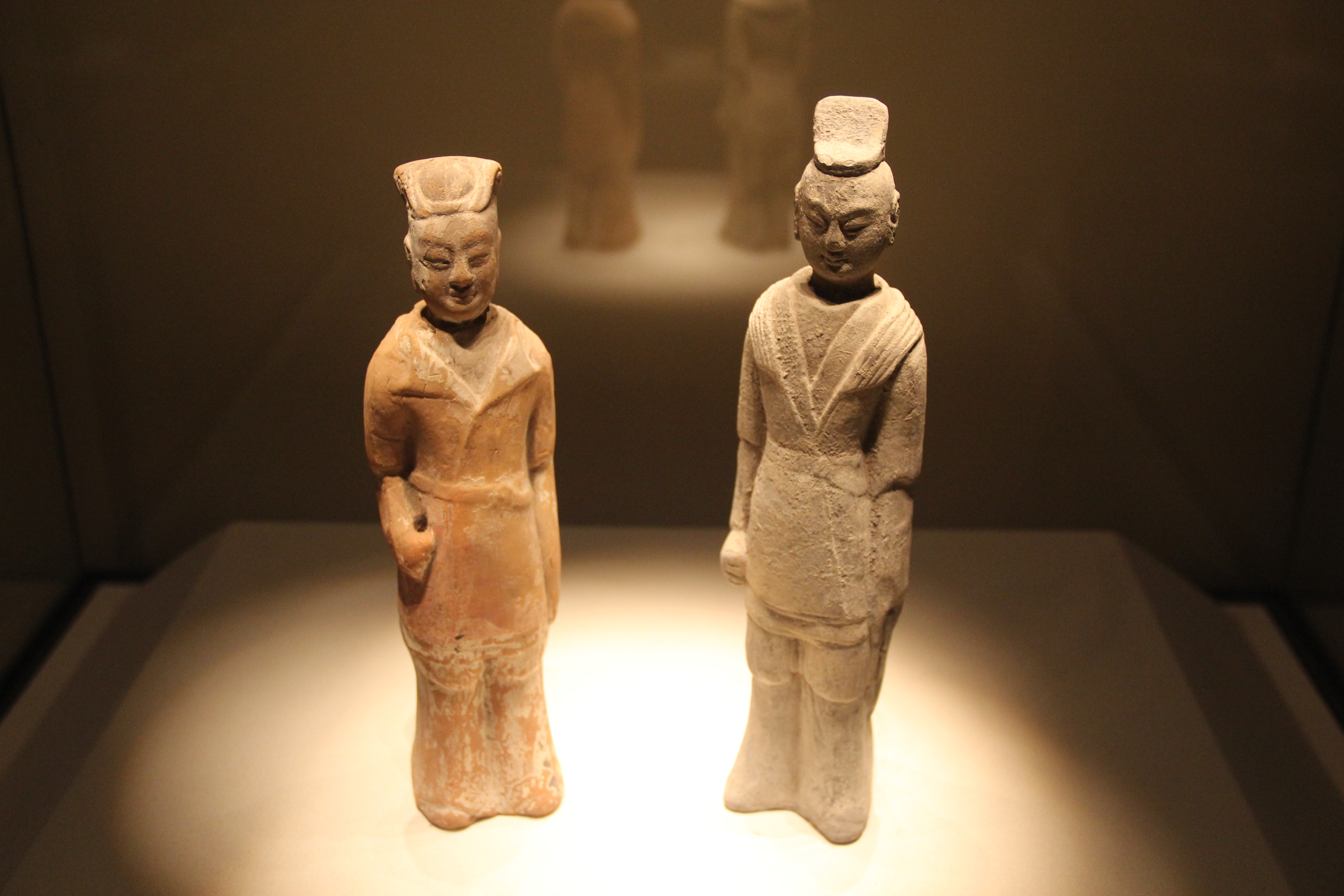
- Figurines from Northern Wei. On the left: Foreign fashion lapel robes On the right: Foreign-influenced or foreign-style cross-collared robes closing to the left side instead of the right side. Traditionally, Chinese style upper garment closes to the right.

Chinese name
- Chinese: 胡服
- Literal meaning: Barbarian clothing
Transcriptions
Standard Mandarin
- Hanyu Pinyin: Húfú

Korean name
- Hangul: 호복
- Hanja: 胡服
Transcriptions
- Revised Romanization: Hobok

Hufu (Chinese: 胡服; pinyin: húfú; Korean: 호복; Hanja: 胡服; RR: hobok), also referred as Hu clothing, nomadic dress, 'barbarian' clothing or dress, or foreign dress, is a generic term which refers to any clothing which was worn in ancient China and its surrounding regions by non-Han Chinese people. This term is also used to refer to clothing of foreign origins in ancient China. The introduction of Hufu-style garments and attire in China occurred by the time of King Wuling of Zhao.

== Terminology ==
The term 'Hu' was adopted to refer to the non-Han Chinese population which could include the ancient 'Hu' northern nomadic people, such as the Xiongnu, as well as the people from the Western regions such as Sogdians, the Sasanid Persian, the Turkic people (Tujue), Uyghur (Huihe or Huihu), Tibetans (Tufan), and the Khitans (Qidan) who lived in the north and west regions of the empire.

== Cultural significance and distinction ==
The traditional way to distinguish between Hufu and Hanfu, Chinese clothing, is by the direction in which the garment collar closes.

=== Chinese collar customs ===
Clothing style which overlaps in the front and closes to the right, known as youren (右衽) originated in China, and was first worn during the Shang dynasty in China. The youren collar is an important symbol of the Han Chinese, and traditionally Chinese robes and Chinese jackets must cover the right part of the body. However, the Chinese did also wear clothing which overlaps in the front and is closed on the left side, in a style known as zuoren (左衽). According to the Shuowen Jiezi (說文解字), a form of paofu, known as xi (襲), was a robe with a zuoren closure. The coat known as zhe (褶); sometimes referred as xi), typically used as part of the kuzhe, was also a xi (襲) according to the Shiming.

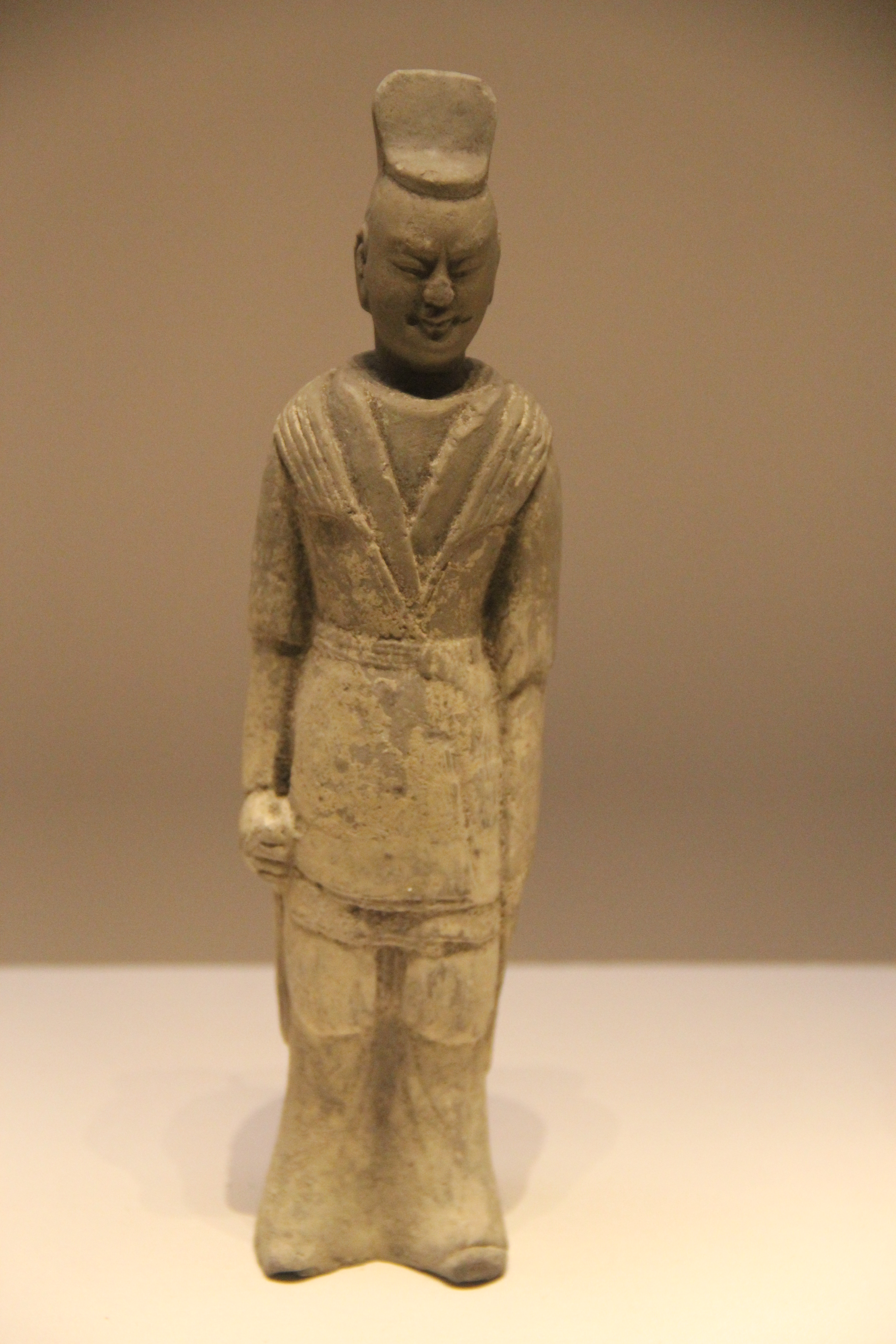
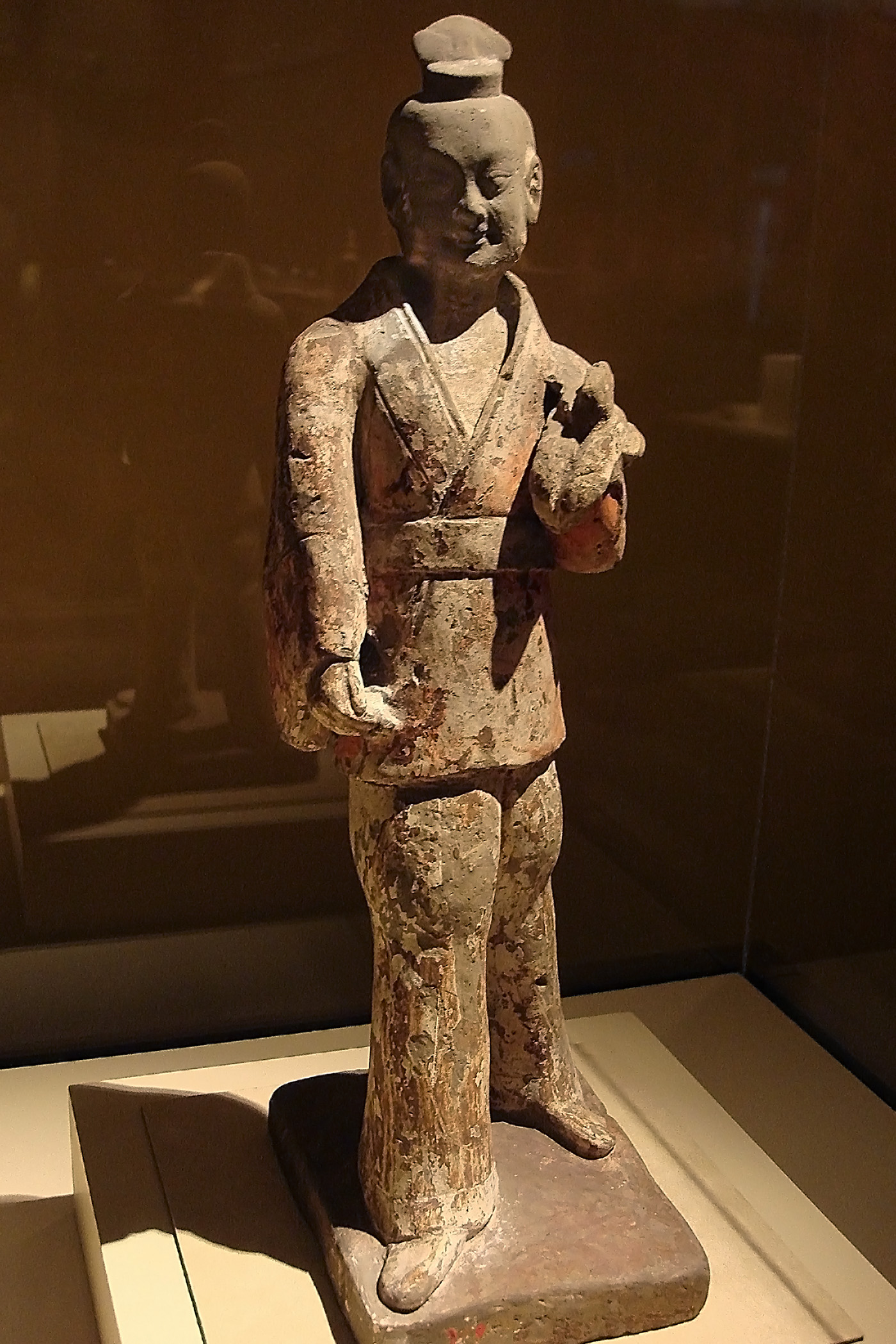
Left: Figure of a warrior, wearing a form of kuxi which closes to the left (左衽), a feature associated with Hufu-style clothing, Northern Qi. Right: Figure of an officer wearing a type of kuxi which closes to the right (右衽) in a typical Chinese way, Northern Wei.

The use of zuoren, however, was typically associated with funeral practices. This can also be found in the chapter Sang da ji (喪大記) of the Liji (禮記):

小斂大斂，祭服不倒，皆左衽結絞不紐

At both the dressings the sacrificial robes were not placed below the others. They were all placed with the lapel to lie on the left side. The bands were tied firmly, and not in a bow-knot.

According to ancient Chinese beliefs, the only moment a Han Chinese was supposed to close their clothing in the zuoren-style is when they dressed their deceased. This funeral practice stemmed from ancient Chinese beliefs in the yin and yang theory, where it is believed that the left represents the yang aspect and stands for life, whereas the right represents the yin aspect, which stands for death. Based on this belief, the left lapel needs to be outside (i.e. youren) to indicate that the power of the yang is suppressing the yin, and was thus reserved for the clothing of living people. However, if the yin aspect surpasses the yang, which is represented by the zuoren, then this form of clothing is to be worn by the deceased. Therefore, it was taboo in ancient China for a living person to wear zuoren.

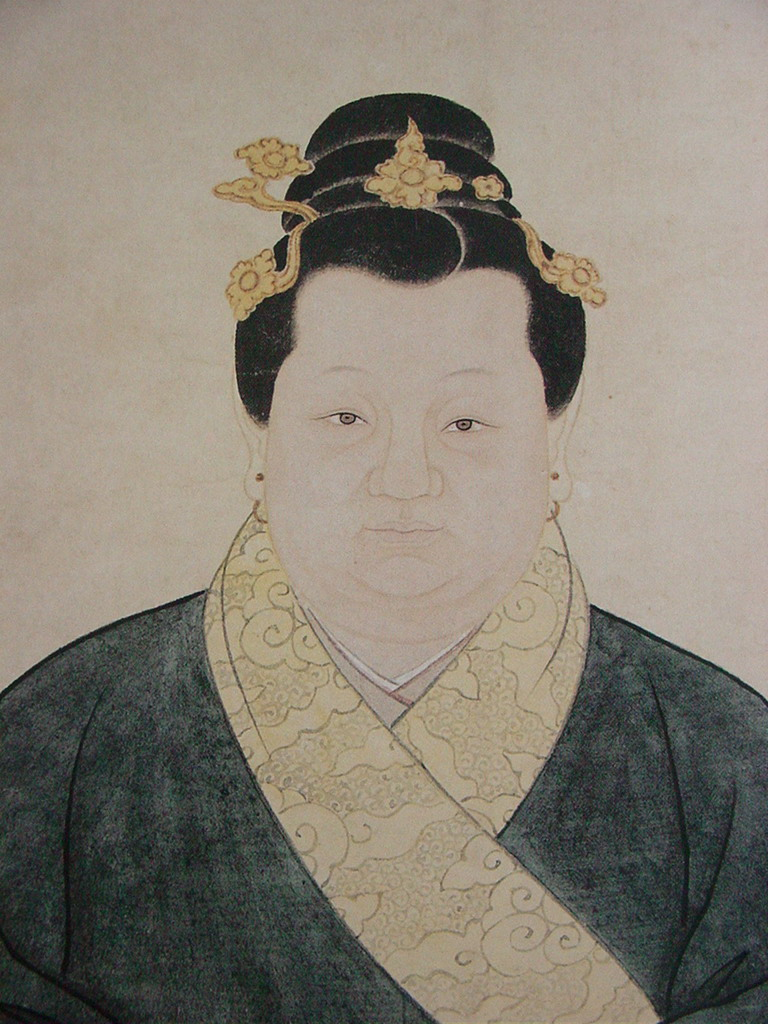
Some paintings of the Ming dynasty depict Han Chinese people with zuoren clothing, an atypical feature

The rule of wearing youren was not always respected by the Han Chinese: for example, in the 10th century, some ethnic Han Chinese could be found wearing left-lapel clothing in some areas (such as Northern Hebei); and following the fall of the Yuan dynasty, left lapel ru continued to be worn in some areas of the Ming dynasty despite the dynasty being led by Han Chinese.

=== Collar customs of ethnic minorities, non-Chinese ethnicities, and foreigners ===
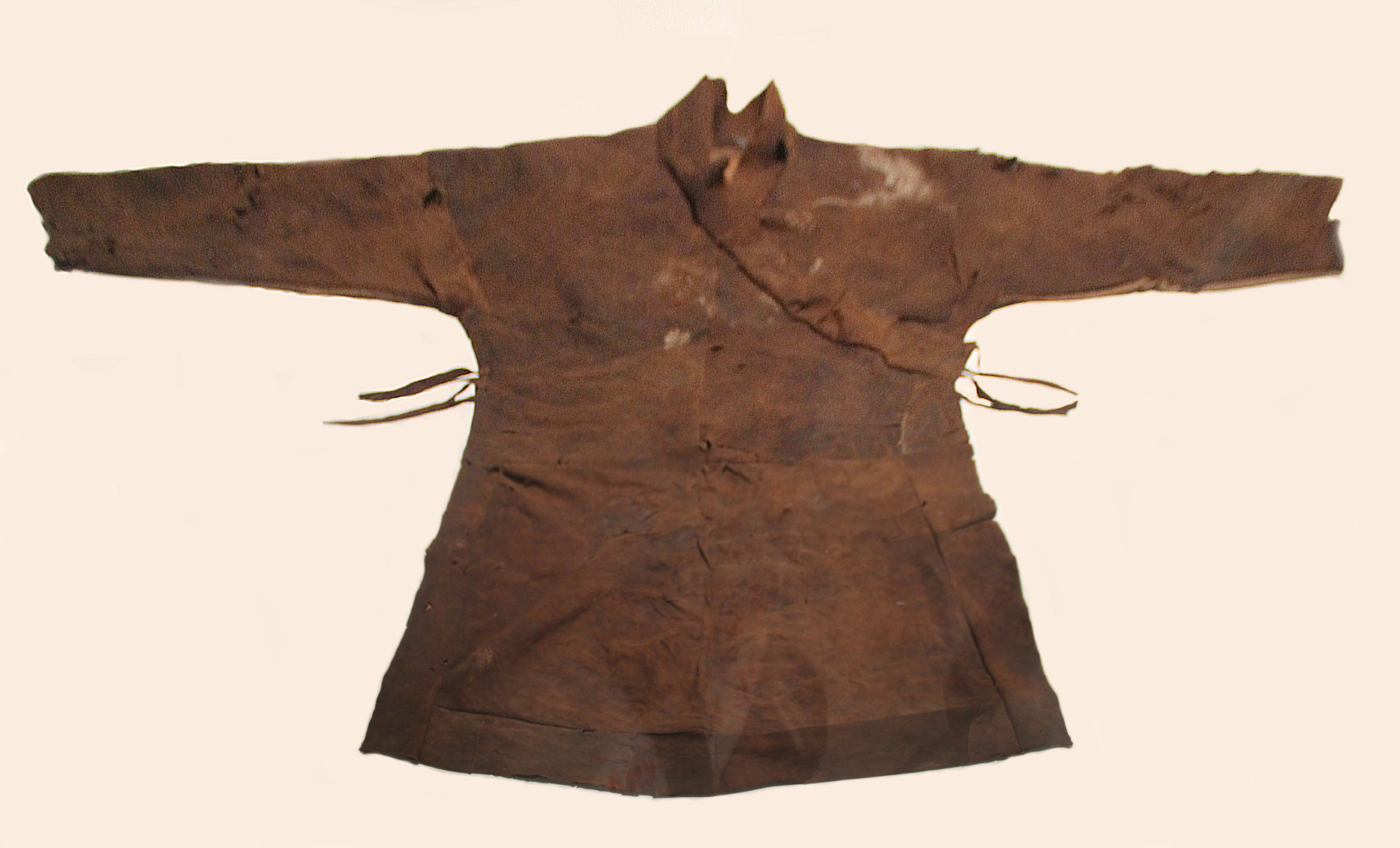
Xiongnu leather robe closing to the left side (zuoren), Han period.

On the other hand, some ethnic minorities, such as the Xianbei, Khitans, and other kingdoms such as Goguryeo, who were living in surrounding areas had clothing which generally closed in the zuoren-style in ancient China. This can also be found in the Analects where Confucius himself praised Guan Zhong for preventing the weakened Zhou dynasty from becoming barbarians:

微管仲，吾其被髮左衽矣

But for Guan Zhong, we should now be wearing our hair unbound [pifa], and the lapels of our coats buttoning on the left side [zuoren].

Based on Confucius' sayings, bèifà zuǒrèn (被发左衽; 被髮左衽; 'unbound hair left lapel'), bound hair and coats which closed on the left side in the zuoren-style, was associated with the clothing customs of the northern nomadic ethnic groups who were considered as barbarians. During his time, unbound hair and clothing closing to the left were the clothing customs of the northern nomadic ethnic groups which were considered as barbarians by the Han Chinese. Moreover, from the standpoint of the Huaxia culture, pifa was a way to reject refined culture and being turned into a barbarian.

By the Han dynasty, since Confucius himself was the first person to use the phrase pifa zuoren to refer to Non-Zhou dynasty people, this phrase became a common metaphor for primitiveness. When used by the ancient Chinese literati, the concept of pifa zuoren became a phrase, which held the symbolic of foreign people who were living a barbarous and civilized lifestyle; this concept also became a way to emphasize the customs differences between the Han people and other ethnic minorities and draw the line to distinguish who were considered as civilized and barbarians. The zuoren thus also became a reference to Hufu, Hufu-style, and/or to the rule of foreign nationalities; for example, as observed in the Liao dynasty and in the female clothing of the Yuan dynasty when it was a common practice for some Chinese women to change the direction of their collar to the left side. Some non-Chinese ethnicity who adopted Hanfu-style sometimes maintain their left lapels, such as the Khitans in the Liao dynasty.

== History ==
=== Warring States period ===
==== Hufuqishe policy ====
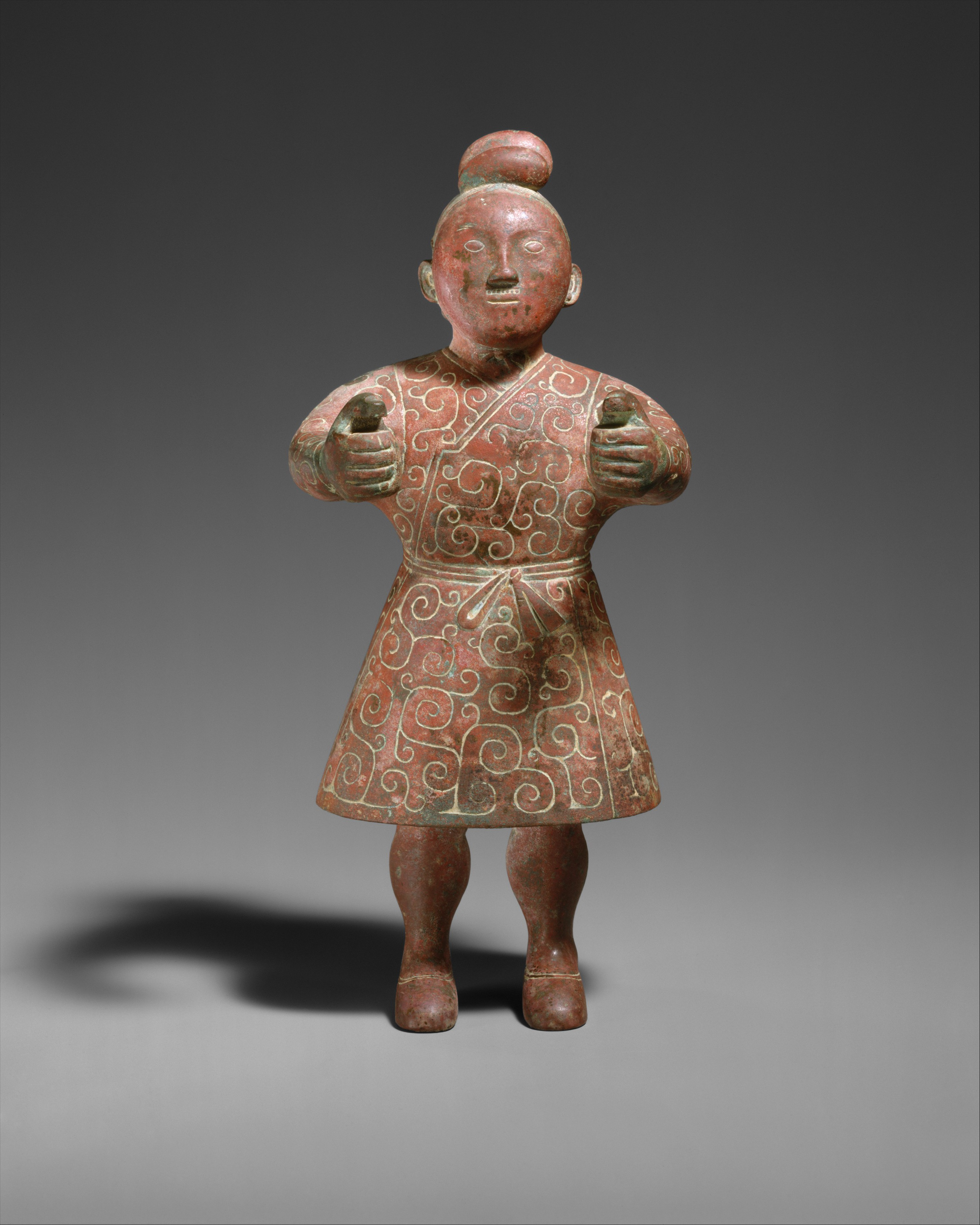
One of the earliest Chinese representations of nomadic peoples on the northern frontier; a charioteer wearing a short sword and belted jacket, a form of clothing which was designed for an equestrian culture, Warring States period (475–221 B.C.), China.

During the Warring States period, King Wuling of Zhao (r. 326–298 BC) instituted the Hufuqishe (胡服騎射; 'Hu clothing and mounted archery') policies which involved the adoption of Hufu to facilitate horse riding. During this period, the term 'Hufu' was coined after the 'Hu' people, who were northern nomadic people.

In the Shiji (史記), Zhao Shijia (lit. 'Hereditary Family of Zhao'), it is said that King Wuling undertook those sartorial reforms in the 19th year of his reign in 307 BCE. However, according to the Bamboo Annals, an annalistic history of Wei unearthed from a Wei King tomb in 279 BC, the Zhao court had ordered commanders, officers, and their families, and garrison guards to adopt Hefu (貉服) in 302 BC. The term 'He' used in the Bamboo Annals is a synonym of the term 'Hu' which refers to the northern nomadic people.

Under this sartorial and military reform, all the soldiers of King Wuling had to wear the uniforms of Donghu, Linhu, and Loufan in battles. The choice to adopt cavalry and the departure from the chariot warfare from the 8th to 5th century BC showed the influence of the Xiongnu, who were the northern neighbour of the Zhao state. The reality or the extent of King Wuling's reforms is a disputed subject among historians.

The Hufu adopted by King Wuling can be described as shangxi xiaku (上褶下袴; 'short coat on upper body', 'trousers on lower body'); this form of attire is described as being composed of trousers, a (short) shirt or jacket with tighter (tubular-shaped) sleeves, xue (靴; 'boots'), belt, and belt buckle.

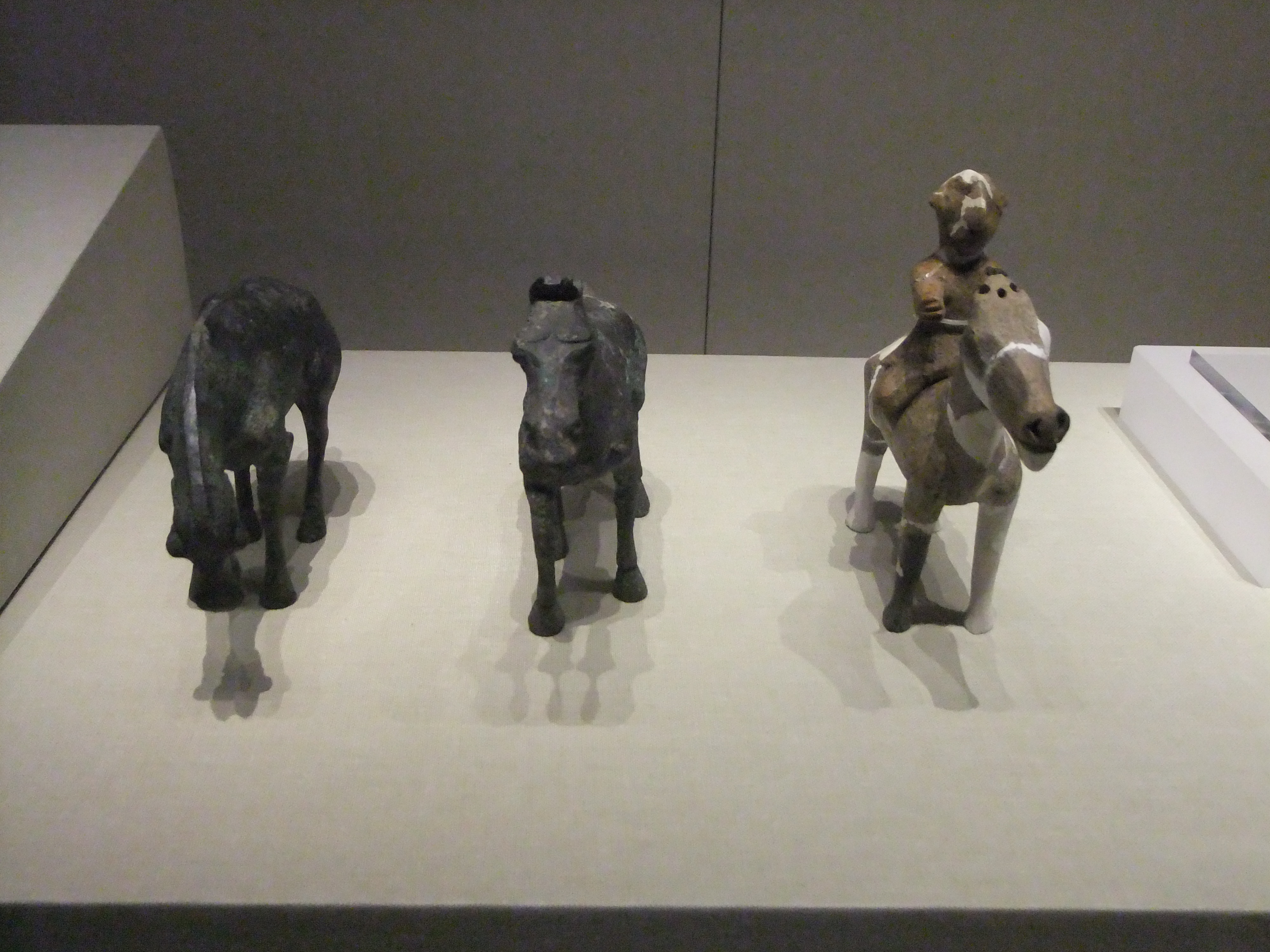
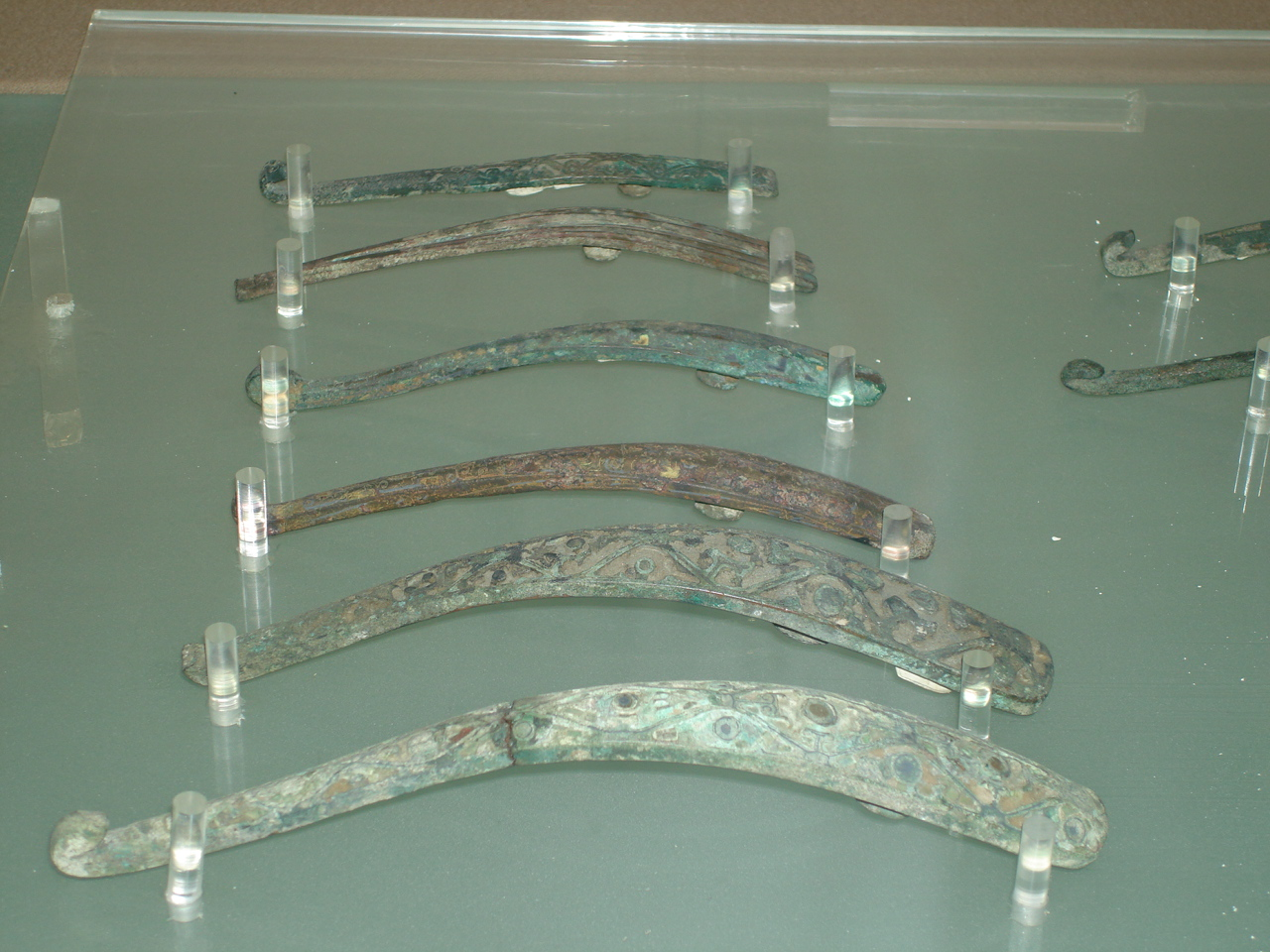
Left: Figurine of the foreign Hu wearing what appears to be a round collar garment, Warring States period. Right: Bronze belt Hooks, Warring States period.

However, the Hufu-style trousers introduced by King Wuling were characterized with loose rises and differed from the indigenous ku (袴) of the Chinese; the Hufu-style trousers could be described as form of kun (裈); the kun were trousers which had rise to cover the crotch areas. A conical cap which resembles Scythian hats was also adopted as part of the Hufuqishe. Of note of importance, although the Hufu-style attire adopted by King Wuling appears to be similar to Scythian clothing, the Hufu which appears in classical Chinese text were actually different from the historical Scythian clothing. For example, the hat adopted by King Wuling was less pointy that the Scythian hat and were decorated with a marten tail.

In the Warring States period, the wearing of short upper garment worn by the Chinese which is belted with a woven silk band and had a right-opening also influenced the Hufu; this form of attire was worn together with trousers allowing greater ease of movement. This form of clothing attire was most likely worn by peasants and labourers.

==== Influence of Hufu-style kun on the development of Chinese trousers, ku ====
Prior to the introduction of Hufu by King Wuling, Chinese people wore the traditional Chinese clothing system which consisted of the combination of yi (衣) or ru (襦), both of which were upper garment which typically closed to the right in a style known as jiaoling youren (交領右衽), the indigenous Chinese trousers referred as ku (袴), also known as jingyi (胫衣), which were in the form of knee-high trousers which were tied to the calves of the wearer allowing the thighs to be exposed and appeared as early as the Neolithic period and was the original form of ku trousers) in early time, and chang (裳; "lower skirt") which is the predecessor of qun (裙), to hide the lower body. People could also wear yichang (衣裳) without wearing ku.

The type of trousers introduced by King Wuling in Central China was referred as kun (裈) instead of ku; the kun were trousers with loose rise (i.e. which cover the crotch areas) which was first used among the military troops. As the kun-trousers did not conform to the traditional culture of the Han, the kun was mainly worn by warriors and servants, but kun were not used by the general population as people found it hard to adjust the use of kun in their daily activities. The kun however influenced the development of jingyi by transforming the jingyi into becoming longer, stretched up to the thighs regions, and the waist become enclosed however the rise and rear of those trousers were open which allowed for the purpose of urinating and defecting; this then became the pattern of ku-rousers. This form of ku-trousers was more accepted in the Han tradition than the kun, and evolved into other forms of ku trousers of the later dynasties, such as qiongku (trousers with hip and rise area closed in the front and tied at the back with multiple strings) which was designed in the Western Han dynasty.

Kun trousers introduced by King Wuling later developed into other forms of trousers in the later period, such as dashao (trousers with extremely wide legs) which appeared in the Han dynasty and dakouku (trousers which were tied under the knees). These forms of trousers were Chinese innovations.

=== Han dynasty ===
Some forms of hanfu worn in the Eastern Han dynasty started to be influenced by the costumes of the Hu (胡) people and the gown with round collar started to appear. However, in this period, the round collar gown was more commonly used as an under-garment.

=== Wei, Jin, Northern and Southern dynasties ===
This was a period of cultural integration and cultural exchange between the Han Chinese and the other ethnic groups. The Han Chinese living in the South liked the driving clothing of the Northern minorities which was composed of trousers and xi (a close-fitting short robe with round neck and tight sleeves). The northern nomads also introduced their leather boots (靴; xue), quekua (缺胯); a type of crotch-length garment which was a long jacket with tight sleeves but less overlap compared to the traditional clothing worn by the Chinese allowing greater ease of movement, where the collar was either round and snug or slightly plunged allowing the undershirt to be visible; and the hood and cape ensemble in China. However, not all stylistic innovations in clothing came from the Northern minorities in this period. For example, the trousers tied with chords below the knee worn in the kuxi (褲褶; 'trousers and jacket') during the Six dynasties were Chinese inventions and were not nomadic clothing. The Kuzhe (袴褶) of the late Northern dynasties was a creation of Han culture which was developed through the assimilation of non-Han culture.

==== Influences of the Xianbei and ban of Xianbei clothing ====
During the Wei, Jin, Northern and Southern dynasties, northern nomadic peoples introduced other styles of round collar (盤領; panling) robe in China. The round collar robe introduced by the Xianbei had tight sleeves which allowed for greater ease of riding when horse riding. Since the Northern Wei dynasty, the shapes of the Han Chinese robes started to be influenced by the round collar robes. The Xianbei were originally a branch of the Donghu which were defeated by the Xiongnu but they later claimed to be descendant of the Yellow Emperor as the Chinese. The Northern Wei period was a period of cultural integration between the Xianbei and the Han Chinese; the Xianbei ruling elites adopted Chinese clothing and Chinese customs while the Han Chinese started to integrate some of the Xianbei's nomadic style clothing which included high boots and round-collar robes with narrow sleeves into Han clothing. In the murals of Lou Rui tomb of Northern Qi (dated to 570), a procession of riders appear to be clothed in quekua and wearing boots and headgear. However, the other figures found in the tomb of Lou Rui are dressed in styles closer to the traditional Hanfu style, showing wide sleeves and lapels closing to the right side.

Xianbei clothing

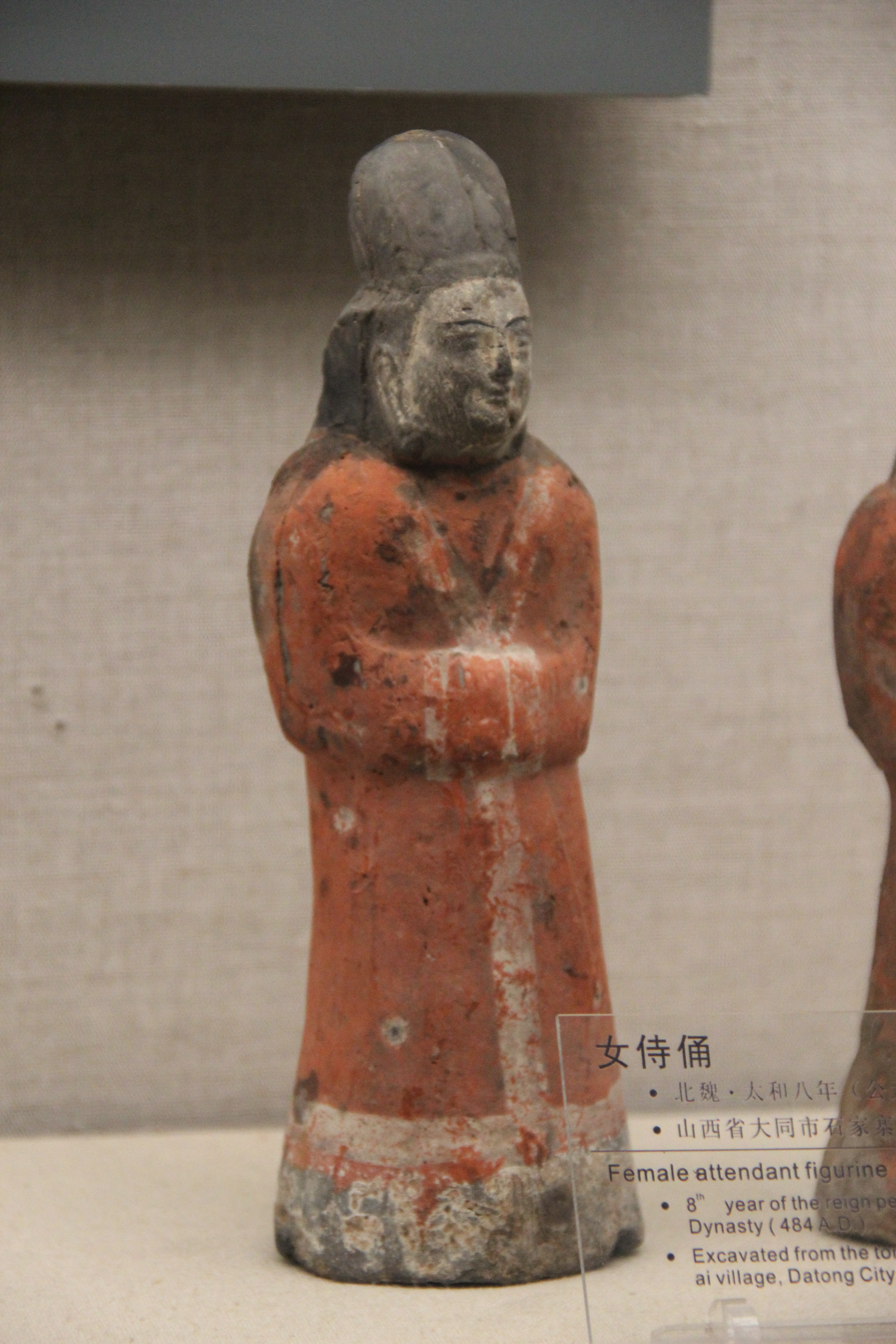
Xianbei women typically wore a long robe under a jacket instead of trousers and boots. Xianbei clothing had zuoren openings (i.e. closed on the left side).

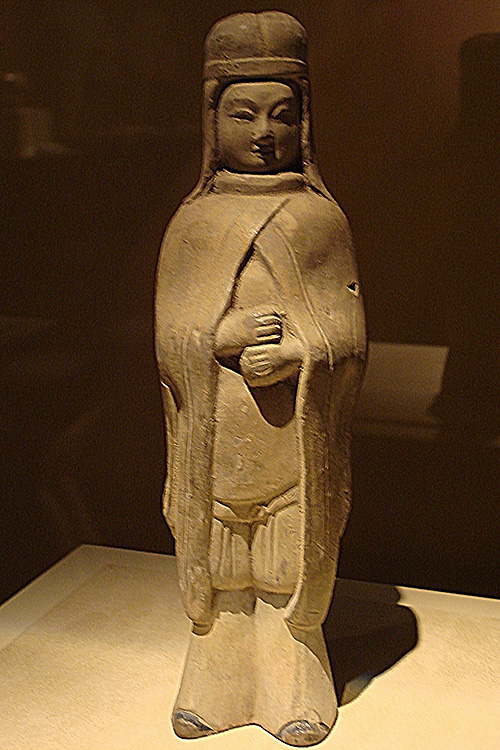
The cape and hood was another nomad outfit which was distinctively Xianbei.

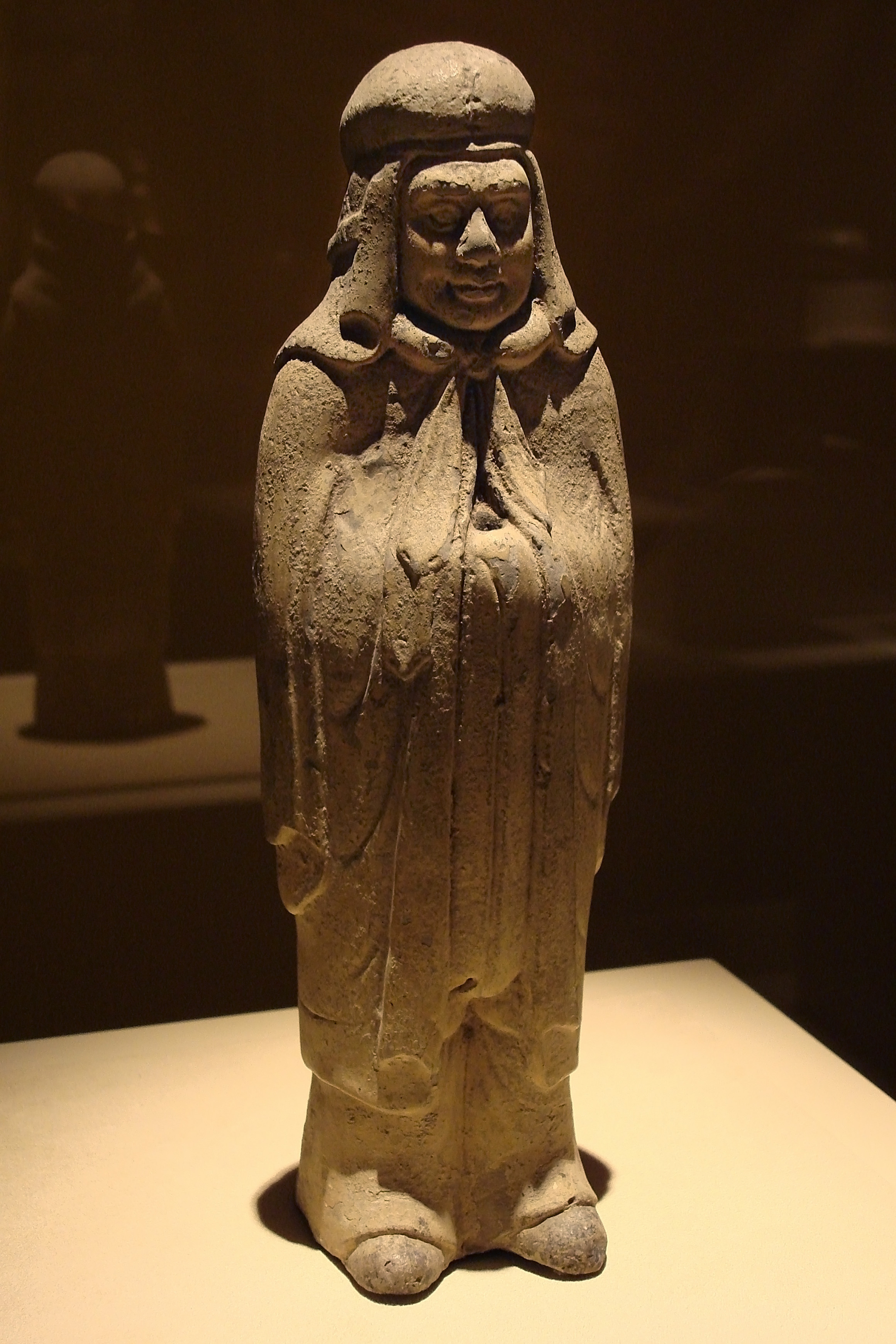
The cape and hood was another nomad outfit which was distinctively Xianbei.

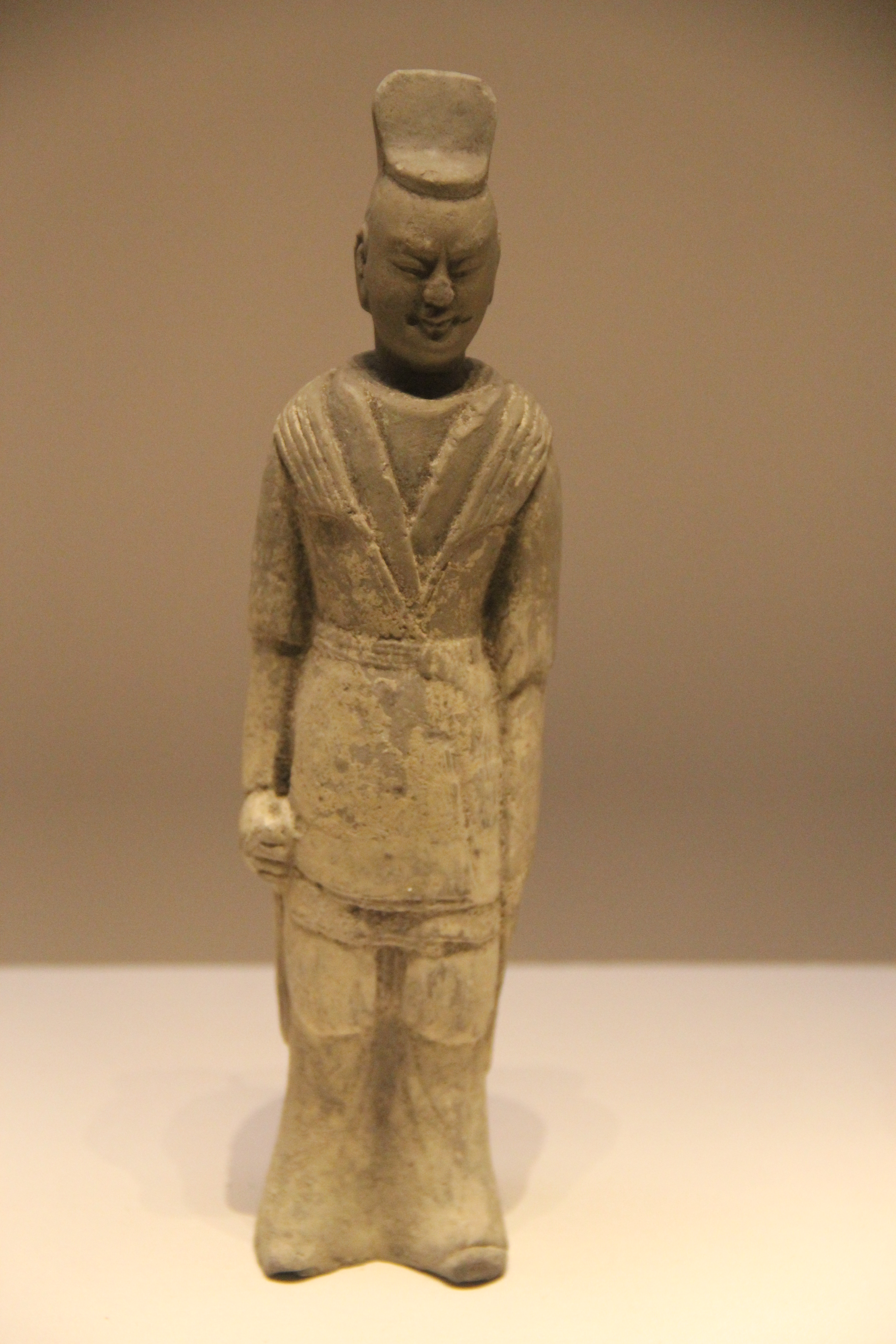
A form of kuxi. The cross collar closing to the left shows foreign influence. The trousers are however Chinese trousers.

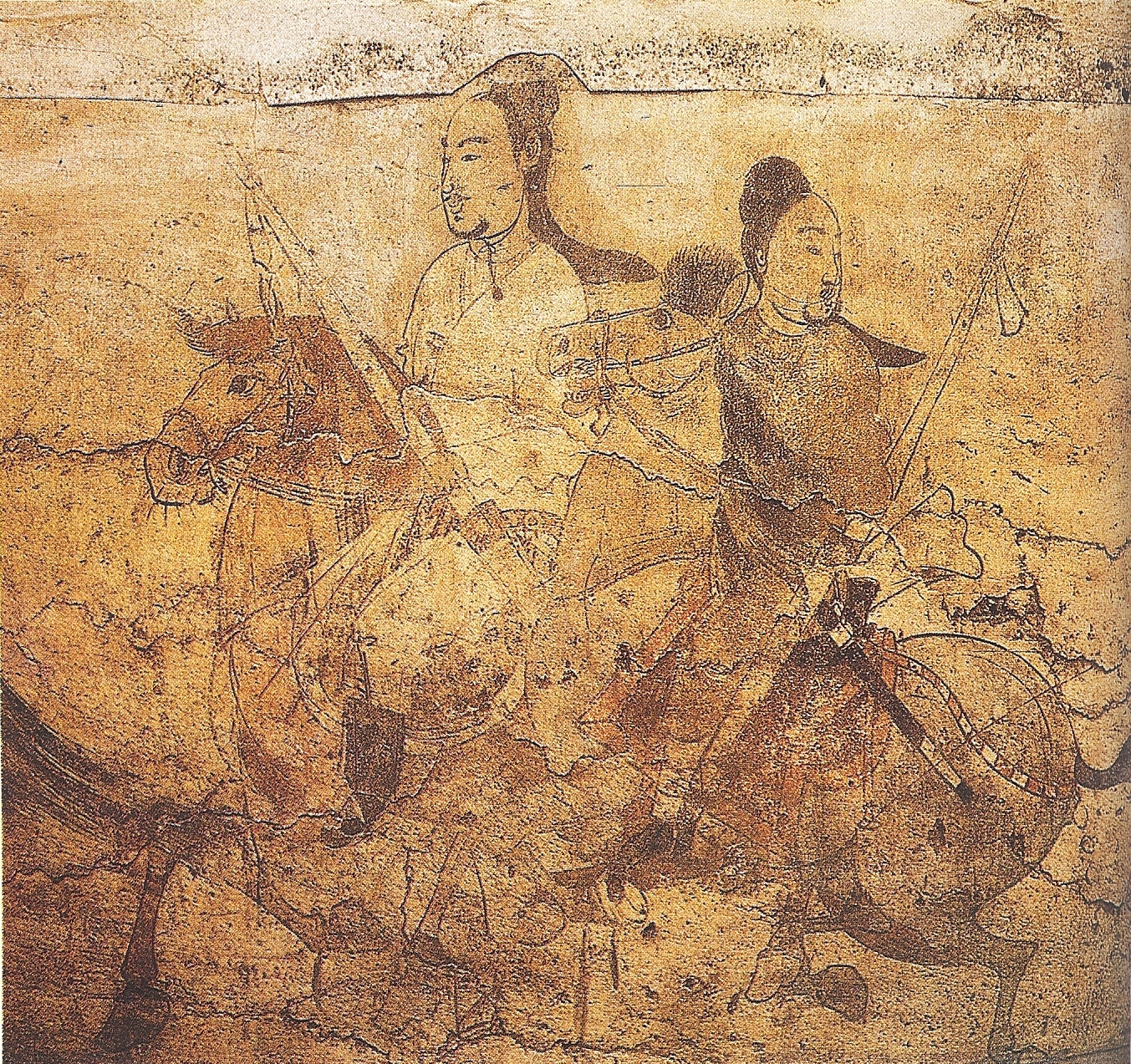
Riders from the murals from the Tomb of Lou Rui appear to be wearing quekua.

The Xianbei rulers continued to wear own distinctive Xianbei clothing in order to maintain their ethnic identity and avoid merging with the Chinese majority population. However, under the sinicization policies under Emperor Xiaowen of Northern Wei, Hufu (Northern barbarian clothing) was banned. This ban of Hufu also included the ban on Xianbei clothing. The ban also included non-Han language at Northern Wei court, and the changing of the royal family surname Tuoba to Yuan. Many members of the Tuoba Xianbei adopted Han Chinese clothing, language, surnames and customs. However, this sinicization policies were also met with opposition by other ethnic minority groups. After the fall of the Northern Wei, male figures started to reappear wearing Xianbei-style clothing on Buddhist monuments and tomb murals; however, the Xianbei-style clothing worn by women are no longer seen in the art of China after the year 500 AD. These re-emerging Xianbei clothing following the fall of the Northern Wei also showed minor changes. After the year 500 AD, women would appear in Chinese-style clothing while men could be found dressed in either Xianbei-style or Chinese-style clothing. In the tomb of Xu Xianxiu (d. 571 AD), Xu Xianxiu, a Northern Qi aristocrat, is depicted wearing Xianbei-style tunic, trousers, and boots and what appears to be a cloak of Central Asian fashion while his wife is wear a Chinese-style robe. Some female servants depicted on the tomb mural of Xu Xianxiu appear to be dressed in clothing which looks closer to the Xianbei style garment than the Chinese-style clothing due to the use of narrow sleeves; however, this form of clothing is not representative of the Xianbei style clothing worn before the year 500 AD.

==== Influences of Sogdians ====
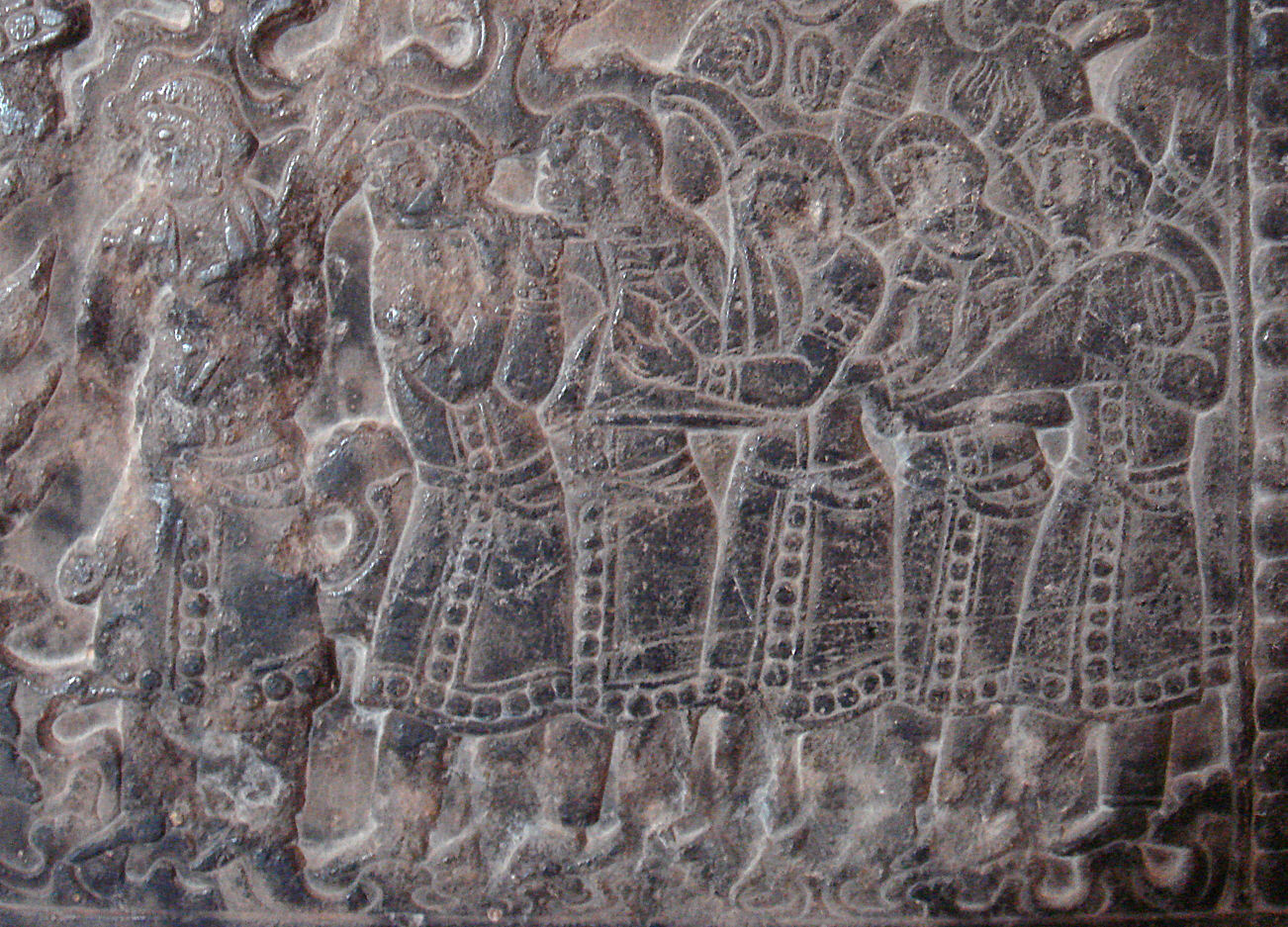
Sogdian musicians from a funerary couch, Northern Qi

The Sogdians were also called Hu (胡) in Chinese. The Sogdians and their descendants (mostly from the merchants class) living in China during this period also wore a form of knee-length yuanlingpao-like kaftan that retained their own ethnic characteristics but with some East Asian influences (i.e. Chinese and early Turks). Under the influence and the demands of the Chinese population, most Sogdian attire in China had to be closed to the right. Their robes would often be buttoned up the neck forming the round collar but occasionally the collar (or lower button) would be undone to form lapel robes (翻领胡服; Fānlǐng húfú; 'Non-Chinese lapel robes'). Lapels robes were popular in Central regions (in the Sogdian regions), Qiuci and Gaochang but originated in Western Asia but spread eastwards through the Sogdians in Central Asia. The Sogdians living in Central Asia and China wore turned-down lapel robes which was popular the Sogdian region of Central Asia in the Western Asia. The Sogdians in China and Sogdia had both lapels down following the Iranian tradition or the tradition of the Saka people living in the Khotan Oasis. It was also not rare for Chinese Sogdians to wear their robes with only the left lapel which was a distinguishing feature as the only left lapel robe was rarely found in Sogdia. These lapels robes appeared as early as in Northern Wei depictions and are the earliest surviving depictions of Xianbei or Han Chinese people wearing lapel robes; these lapels robes became a popular form of fashion in Northern Qi in the Han regions for both men and women. This dressing customs of wearing lapel robe was later inherited and developed in the subsequent dynasties, in the Tang and Sui dynasties.

=== Tang dynasty ===
The Tang dynasty also saw the ready acceptance and syncretization with Chinese practice, of elements of foreign culture by the Han Chinese. The foreign influences prevalent during Tang China included cultures from Gandhara, Turkestan, Persia and Greece. The stylistic influences of these cultures were fused into Tang-style clothing without any one particular culture having especial prominence. An example of foreign influence on Tang's women clothing is the use of garment with a low-cut neckline. However, just like women in the Tang dynasty period incorporated Central Asian-styles in their clothing, Central Asian women also wore some Han Chinese-style clothing from the Tang dynasty and combined elements of the Han Chinese-style attire and ornament aesthetic in their ethnic attire.

==== Yuanlingshan, lapel robes, and foreign-influences on headwear ====
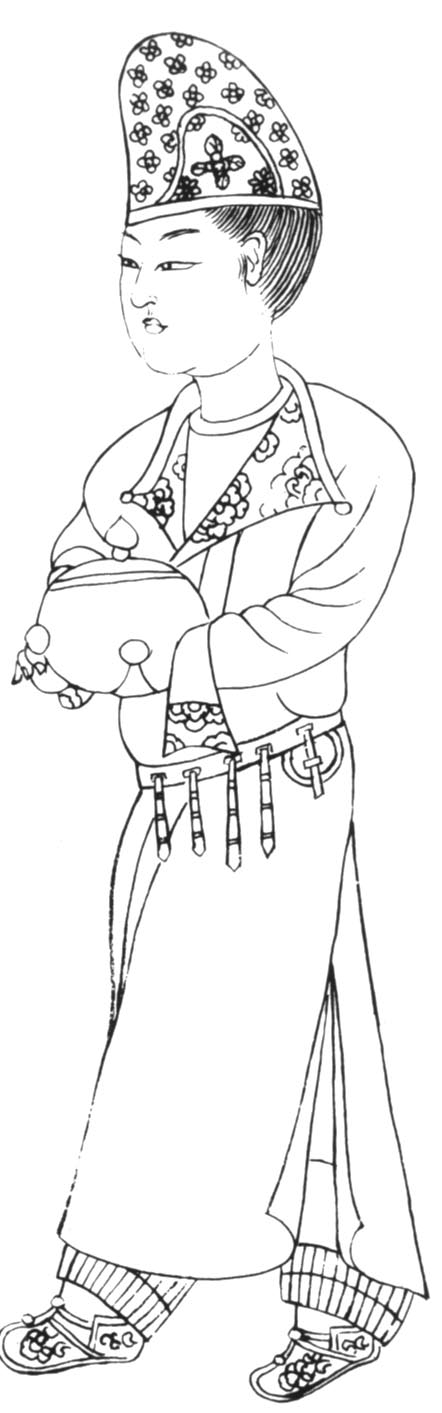
Woman wearing hufu (lapel robes and stripped Persian trousers) in Tang dynasty

In the Tang dynasty, the descendants of the Xianbei and the other non-Chinese people who ruled northern China from 304 to 581 AD lost their ethnic identity and became Chinese; the term Han was used to refer to all people of the Tang dynasty instead of describing the population ruled by the Xianbei elites during the Northern dynasties. The round-collar jacket and gown, tied with a belt at the waist, became a typical form of fashion for both Tang dynasty men and women as it was fashionable for women to dress like men in the Tang dynasty.

The Hufu, which was popular in this period was the clothing worn by the Tartars and the people who lived in the Western regions, was brought from the Silk Road. In the early Tang dynasty, the influence of hufu was described as a pastiche of Turkic, Uyghur, Sogdian and Sasanid Persian clothing. Hufu-style in this period included jacket with open-front with narrow-fitting sleeves, striped, tapered trousers, woven boots, and weimao (i.e. wide-brimmed hat with an attached gauze veil). Other forms of ufu included: mili (羃䍦), a burqua-like headwear, and a veil-less hat called humao.

Almost all figurines and mural paintings depicting female court attendants dressed in men's clothing are wearing Hufu. During this period, the yuanlingpao could be turned into a lapel robe (influenced by those worn by the Sogdians) by unbuttoning the robes and the lapel robes could be turned into the yuanlingpao when buttoned. In some unearthed pottery figures wearing lapel robes dating from the Tang dynasty, it found that the yuanlingpao had three buttons on the collar. The double overturned lapels with tight-fitting sleeves were known as kuapao (袴袍); a robe which originated from Central Asia), and similarly to the yuanlingshan, the kuapao could be ornate with trims decorated with patterns at the front, sleeve-cuffs and along the lapels. The kuapao was worn by men, but it could be used as a main garment for cross-dressing female attendant or they could be draped on the shoulders of both men and women like a cloak. The lapel robes worn during the Tang dynasty was categorized as Hufu instead of Hanfu; the use of these styles of robes showed the popularity of Hufu during the Tang dynasty, especially during the Wu Zetian period (684–704 AD). The Yuanlingpao however was categorized as Han clothing.

It also popular for people to use fabrics (such as brocade) to decorate the collars, sleeves and front and their gowns; this clothing decoration customs is known as 'partial decorations of gowns' and was influenced by the Sogdians of Central Asia who had entered China since the Northern and Southern dynasties period. Influenced by foreign cultures, some yuanlingshan could also be decorated with Central Asian roundels (i.e. a form of partial decoration) which would run down at the centre of the robe.

==== Huihuzhuang/Uyghur clothing ====
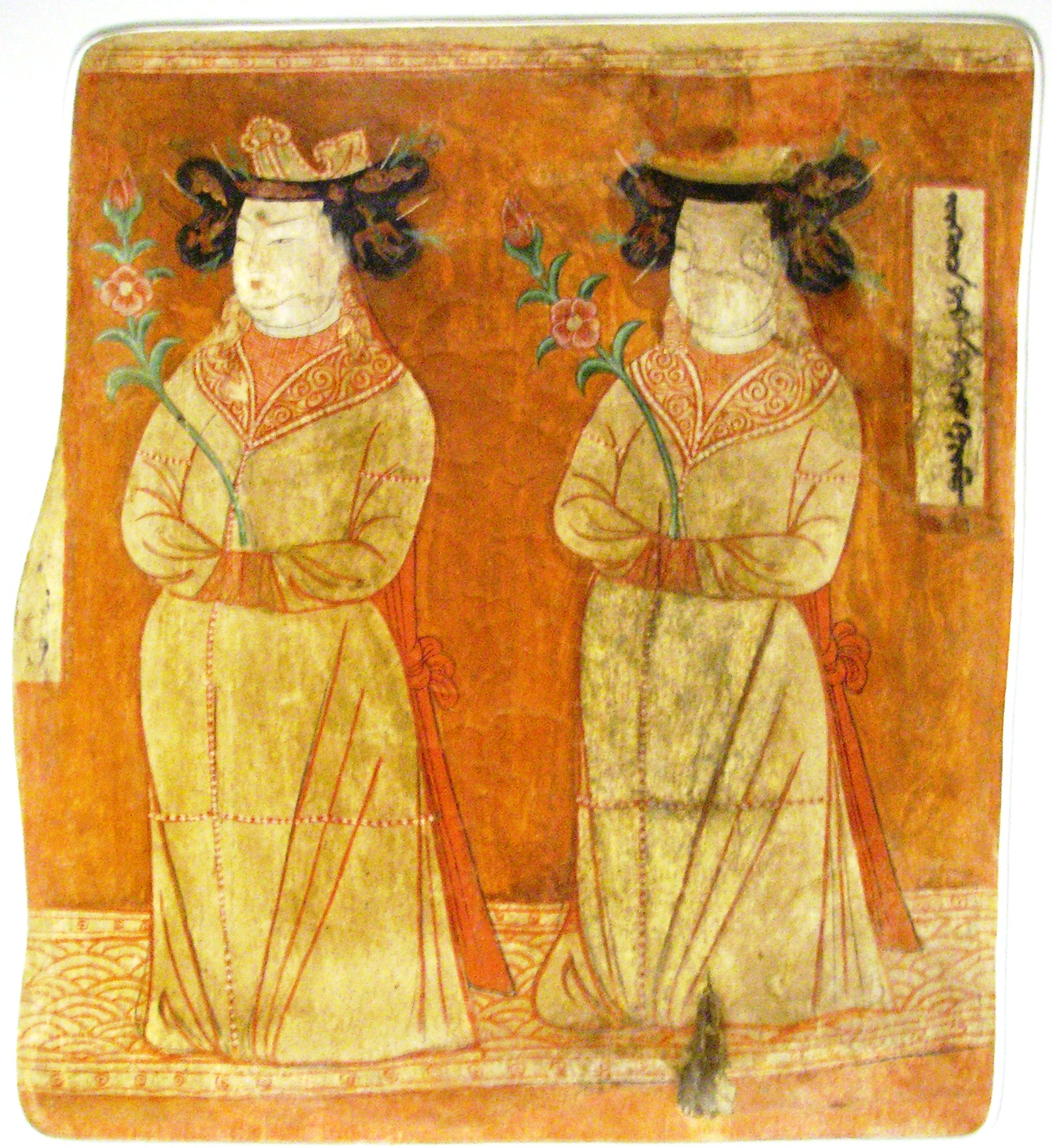
Uyghur princesses wearing Uyghur turned down lapel robes.

It was also fashionable for noble women to wear Huihuzhuang (回鶻装; Uyghur dress, which is sometimes referred as Huihu-style), a turned-down lapel voluminous robes with tight sleeves which were slim-fitting, after the An Lushan Rebellion (755–763 AD). In 840 AD, the Uyghur empire collapsed, the Uyghur refugees fled to Xinjiang and to the Southeast of Tang frontier to seek refuge, and in 843 AD, all the Uighur living in China had to wear Chinese-style clothing.

==== Fading of Hufu in Tang ====
After the High Tang dynasty period, the influences of Hufu progressively started to fade and the clothing started to become more and more loose. and more traditional Han style clothing was restored.

=== Song, Liao, Western Xia, Jin dynasties ===
The Jin dynasty was founded by the Jurchens. In 1126, the Jurchen orders all Chinese people living in the conquered areas to shave their hair on the front and to dress only in Jurchen style. The order to adopt Jurchen hairstyle and clothing style was an Inner Asian practice of forcing people who were living on conquered lands to show their subservience to their conquerors. The order to change into Jurchen hairstyle and clothing was reinforced in 1129. This order however does not appear to have been observed in a strict manner. Under Hailing Wang, who was Pro-Chinese emperor, Chinese people in Honan were allowed to wear Chinese clothing. Under Emperor Shizong, the Jurchen were prohibited to be dressed in Chinese fashion and were forbidden from adopting Chinese personal and last names; this was because during his time (1161–1189), many Jurchen appeared to have adopted Chinese behaviours while the Jurchen had forgotten their own national traditions. By 1170, Chinese men had adopted either Jurchen or mixed Jurchen-Han clothing; Chinese women, especially elite women, however maintained Han-style clothing although the clothing were outdated according to the standards of the Song dynasty. The rulers of Jin gradually abandoned their own customs, including clothing and language for Chinese ones, especially after having moved their capital to Kaifeng.

=== Yuan dynasty ===
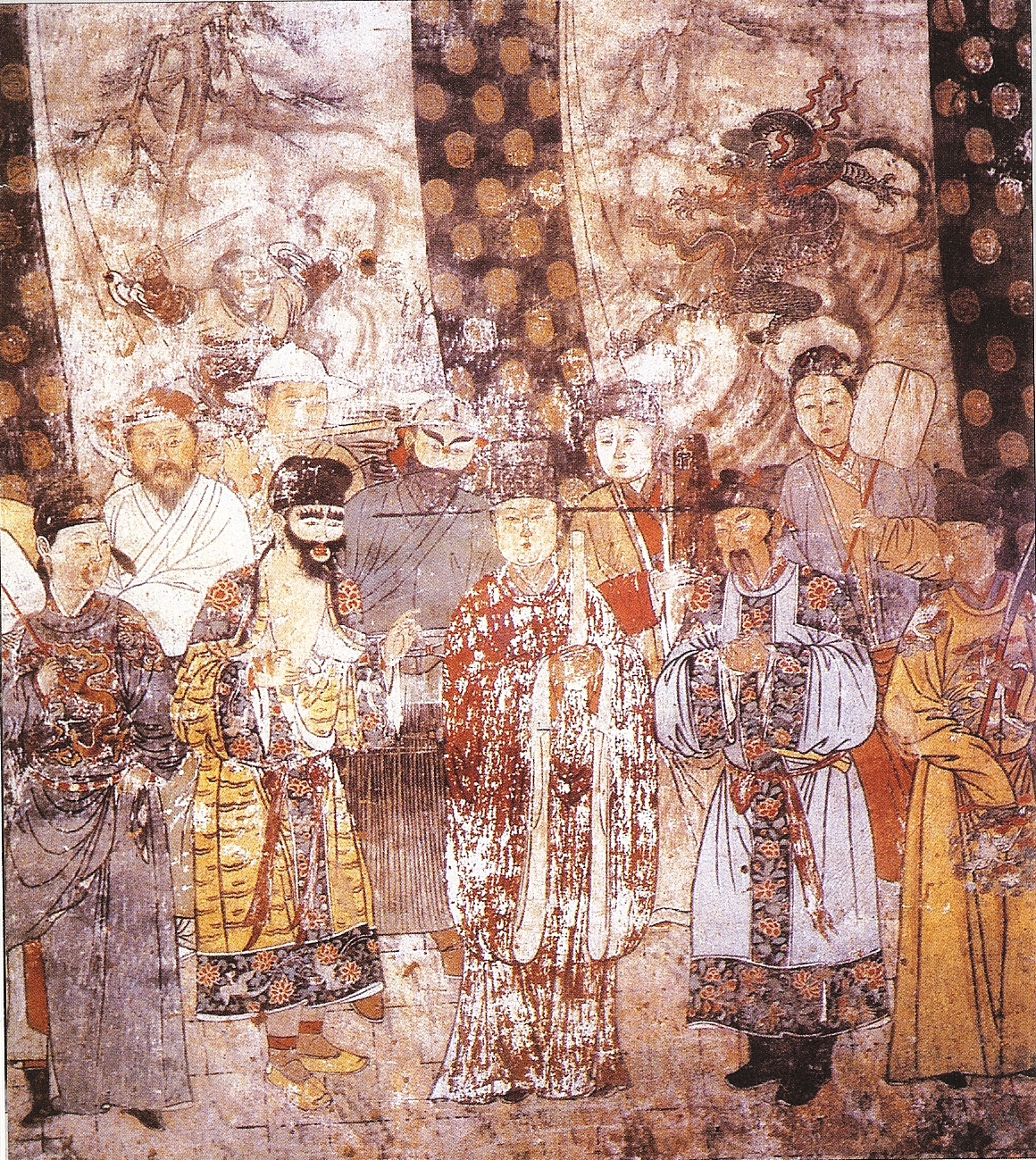
Yuan dynasty theatre actors wore elaborate costumes and stereotyped facial makeup; diverse costumes of different nationalities were worn, Yuan dynasty, 1324 AD.

==== Mongol clothing ====
The Mongol of the Yuan dynasty impacted the clothing worn by the Chinese. According to Song Lian (1310–1381),

"When the Song dynasty collapsed and the Yuan dynasty was founded, people's clothing changed to square and conical straw hats and clothes with narrow sleeves".

Different styles of Mongol clothing were shared and used among different social classes. However, Han Chinese clothing continued to co-exist along with Mongol clothing. During this period, men's casual clothing follows those of the Han Chinese; aristocrats women mainly worn Mongol clothing while common women wore ruqun and banbi. Example of Mongol clothing and hats which influenced the Han Chinese were the boli hat (Chinese: 钹笠帽), terlig, jisün, Mongol-style dahu.

==== Goryeoyang/Goryeo-style ====
The customs of Goryeo clothing became popular at the end of the Yuan dynasty among Mongol rulers, aristocrats, queens and imperial concubines in the capital city. The fashion trend was dubbed goryeoyang (高麗樣) and was described by being a banryeong banbi (方領半臂), the suggested modern interpretation of the physical appearance of such garment (square collar short-sleeved upper garment) was based on the same poem and was drawn in a 2005 study by senior researcher Choi.

=== Ming dynasty ===
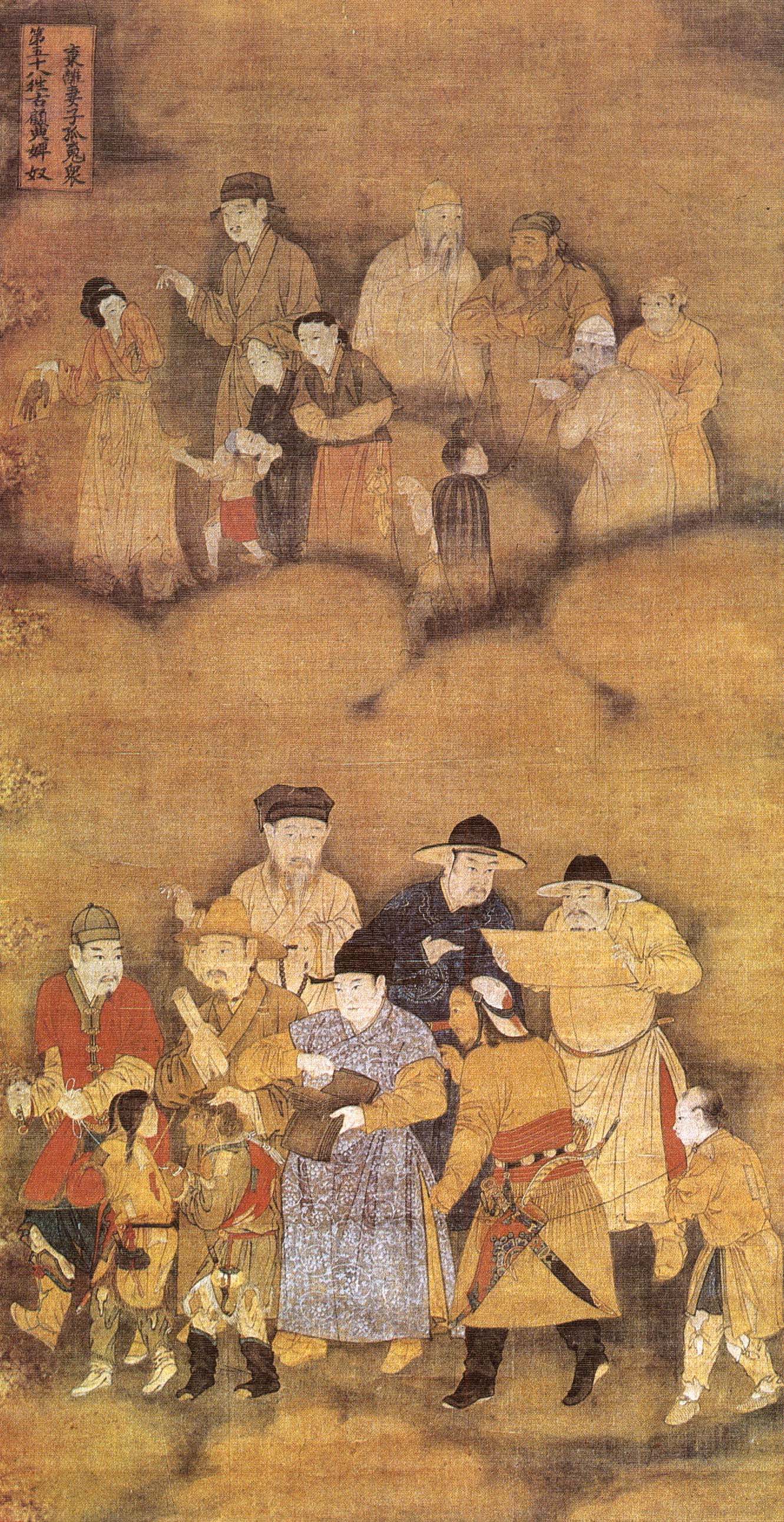
Shuilu ritual painting depicting Han Chinese clothing and Mongolian-style clothing, unknown author, Ming dynasty

Following the fall of the Yuan dynasty, Emperor Taizu promulgated an imperial edict to restore Tang-style clothing and hats in the first year of his reign. In the twenty fourth year of Hongwu (1391), there was an imperial edict which banned the wearing of Hufu; this was specifically for women of gentry. Several other bans were made regarding the wearing of nomad clothing, which was recorded in the Ming dynasty historical records (for example, in 1442, 1491, etc.). Throughout the Ming dynasty period, there were several prohibitions on Mongol style clothing; however, certain clothing of the Ming dynasty influenced or derived from the Mongol clothing continued to be used, such as yesa and dahu.

== Clothing categorized as Hufu ==
- Xiongnu clothing
- Xianbei clothing
- Sogdian clothing in China
- Maweiqun – a crinoline-like underskirt imported in Ming dynasty from Joseon
- Yuan dynasty Mongol clothing: terlig

== Influences ==
Clothing influenced by Hufu and/or Hufu which were adopted and localized into Hanfu are:

- Robes: Yuanlingshan/ yuanlingpao, panling lanshan, fanlingpao (lapel robe), jisün, yesa, dahu of Ming dynasty, tieli of Ming dynasty
- Attire: Shanku, Tanling ruqun
- Upper garments: Ru, Tanling banbi, bijia
- Headwear: wuguan, (Note: The wuguan (武冠) is a military guan, which was derived from the zhaohuiwenguan, the guan which was used by King Huiwen of Zhao. King Huiwen wore the same guan as his father, King Wuling of Zhao, which was a hufu-style hat decorated with marten tail.) heguan (鶡冠), (Note: The heguan is a type of military guan, decorated with two pheasant feathers, which is possibly derived from the hufu-style hat adopted by King Wuling of Zhao as part of the hufuqishe policy) mili, Weimao, humao, futou, damao

== See also ==
- Hanfu
- Paofu – Long Chinese robes
- Qizhuang – Manchu clothing
