= Weimao =

Wide brimmed hat with shoulder-length veil

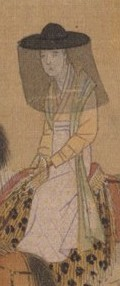
- A lady wearing weimao
- Chinese: 帷帽
- Literal meaning: Veiled hat/curtained hat
Transcriptions
Standard Mandarin
- Hanyu Pinyin: Wéimào

Weimao (Chinese: 帷帽; lit. 'veiled hat or curtained hat') is a type of wide-brimmed hat with a shoulder-length veil hanging. The weimao was a popular form of head covering during the Tang dynasty. It was invented during either the Sui or the early Tang dynasty, according to Liu Zhiji and Zhang Yanyuan. This is a type of hat that can be worn by both men and women.

== History ==
=== Sui and Tang dynasty ===
By the end of the Sui dynasty, the mili, which was previously worn, became less conservative and evolved into the weimao as it was no longer required to conceal the entire body and instead only the face had to be concealed.

In the early and middle Tang dynasty period, it was fashionable for aristocratic women to wear weimao when they went on excursions, a practice which these women borrowed from the northwestern nomadic men.

By the time of Wu Zetian's ascendancy, the weimao was in fashion while the mili had gradually disappeared. The fashion of wearing weimao eventually declined and disappeared in the 8th century before being revived in the 10th century in the Song dynasty.

=== Song dynasty ===
In the Song dynasty, some scholar officials, such as Sima Guang, advocated that women should cover their faces when going out. The weimao-style hat was revived in the 10th century when women started to wear mianyi (面衣; 'veil or facial covering'), which was also known as gaitou (蓋頭; 'head cover') by the common people. It is likely that the practice of wearing veiled hats, which was continued by these Song dynasty women, was due to them being unaware of its foreign and masculine origins.

== Derivatives and influences ==
=== Humao ===
A variation of the weimao is a hat lacking the necessary holes to attach a veil. Instead of a veil, the rider would wear a black balaclava under the hat.

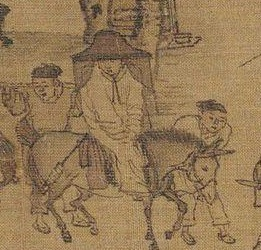
Gaitou hat, Song dynasty.

=== Song dynasty gaitou hat ===
The Song dynasty gaitou (蓋頭), also known as mianyi (面衣; 'facial clothes'; "veil"), follows the style of the Tang dynasty weimao; the gaitou was worn by women when riding donkeys and horses or when they would walk on the streets. The gaitou was a veil hat where a whole piece of purple gauze would hang from the hat from the front to the back sides with 4 ribbons of different colours hanging down the shoulders.

== Similar items ==
- Liangmao
- Damao (hat)
- Humao
- Mili
- Honggaitou

== See also ==
- Hanfu
- Hufu
- Hanfu headgear
- List of hats and headgear
