= Mili (veil) =

Veil which typically covers the entire body

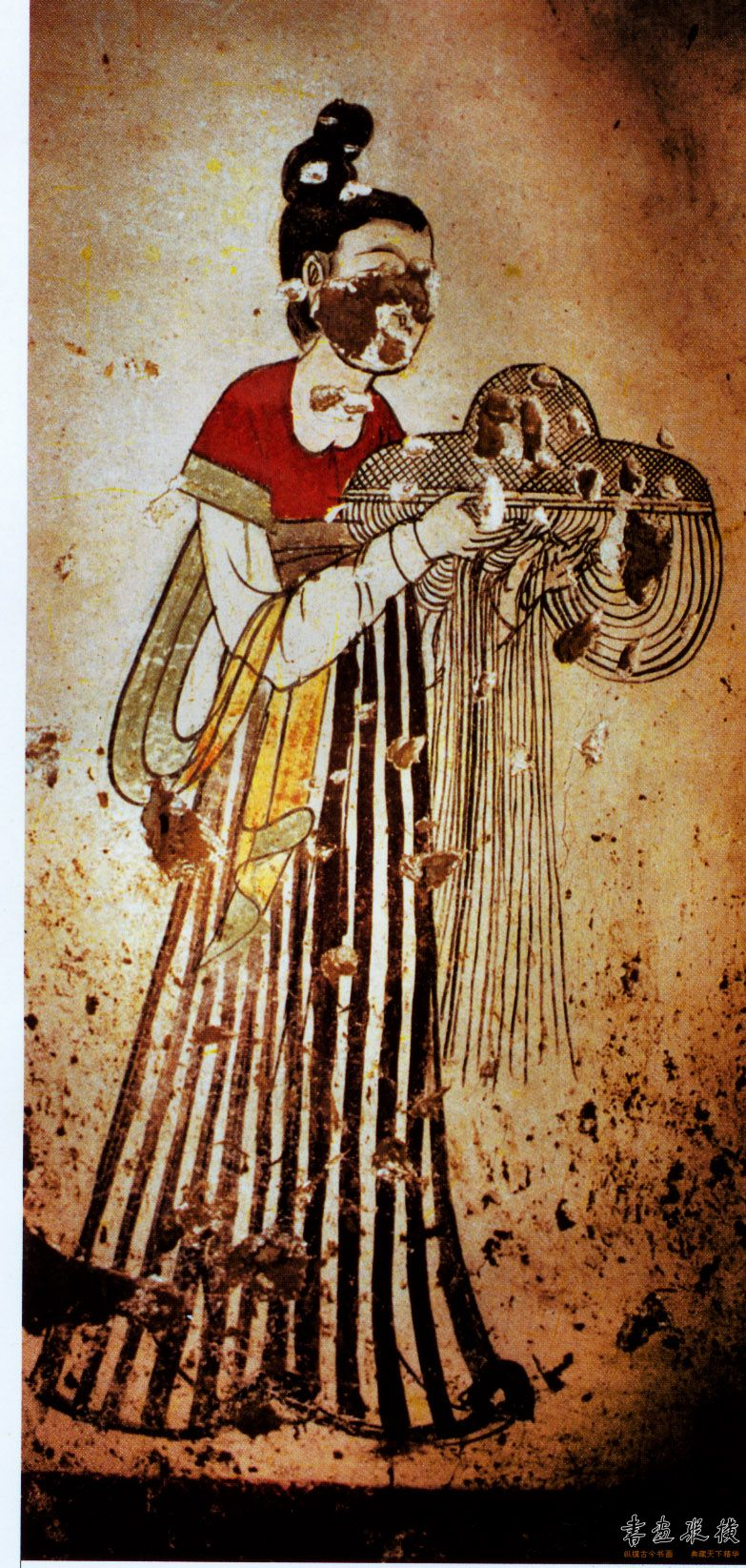
- A Tang dynasty lady holding a mili.
- Chinese: 羃䍦
Transcriptions
Standard Mandarin
- Hanyu Pinyin: Mìlí

Mili (Chinese: 羃䍦; pinyin: mìlí) is a type of Chinese veil which originated from Hufu of the Rong and Yi people cultures. In the Sui to early Tang dynasties, the mili was typically to a body-long veil which was used to conceal the body of women. However, men can also wear it; it was a form of burnoose which was burqua-like. The full-body mili then evolved into the weimao by the end of the Sui dynasty. (Note: A weimao was a veiled-hat which only covered the face instead of the whole body. The veil was shoulder-length.) The full-body mili continued to be worn in the Tang dynasty,but started to lose popularity by the middle of the 7th century. It eventually disappeared completely by 705 AD. Some Tang dynasty mili also only covered the women's face and neck areas.

== Cultural significance ==
Despite its foreign origins rooted in the Rong and Yi cultures, the full-body mili was perceived as an expression of highest propriety in the Central plains. This was also recorded in the New book of Tang, which described the mili as "originating from the barbarians" but was ideal to protect women's modesty as it covered and hid the entire body.

== History ==
=== Origins ===
The full-body mili originated from the Rong and Yi people cultures; it appears to have been adopted from the Tuyuhun, an ethnic minority of Qinghai, and was originally worn by both men and women in the late 6th century. (Note: The Tuyuhun were pastoral people who were living in the northwest of China proper) In the Northwest, it was used to protect against dust. However, in the Central plains, it become a fashionable item.

The full-body mili, which was adopted from the Tuyuhun, was a type of burnoose; it was a large piece of fabric which was draped over the women's head. The mantle of the fabric would fall across the shoulders down to the feet which would then covered most of the body and only allowed the women to see through a small break between the edges.

=== Sui dynasty ===
During the Sui dynasty, it was a body-long veil which was used to conceal the entire body of women from stranger's eyes. It was adopted during the Sui dynasty and became popular among Imperial and ducal house ladies who would ride horses in public. The mili was sometimes covered with jewels. By the end of the Sui dynasty, it was no longer required for women to hide the entire body and the mili became less conservative and evolved into the weimao, which would only conceal the face. It however continued to be worn in the subsequent Tang dynasty.

=== Tang dynasty ===
The full-body mili continued to be worn during the Tang dynasty as it was considered ideal for protecting a women's modesty since it concealed the entire body. Its purpose was to prevent men on the streets from looking at women. However, one of the inconveniences of the mili was that it provided a convenient disguise for rebels when they wanted to escape the authorities’ notice.

The full-body mili was still worn during the Emperor Taizong's time. But by the mid-7th century, it started to lose popularity. When the full-body mili fashion started to fell out of favour for the weimao, Emperor Gaozong of Tang issued two imperial edicts (one in 663 AD and one in 671 AD) to order women to abandon the wear of weimao and return to the full-body mili in order to enforce public decency. These two edicts went almost completely ignored.

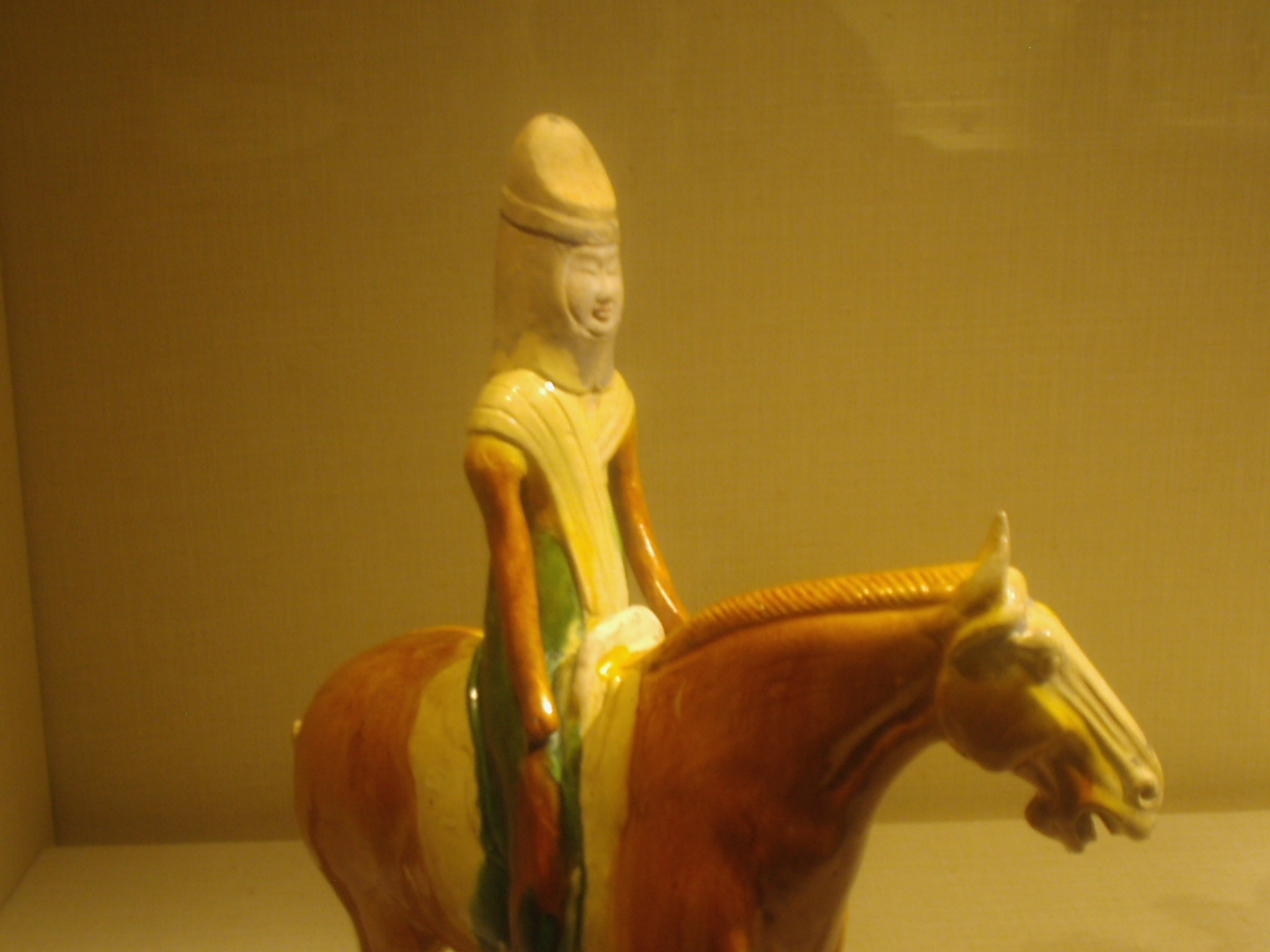
Female rider wearing a hood, similar to a balaclava, which only shows the face, Tang dynasty, late 7th to early 8th century.

Due to those imperial edicts issued by Emperor Gaozong, women decided to substitute the mili with other forms of fashion. One of the alternatives was the use of wearing hoods that only allowed the face be shown. The other alternative to the mili was the wearing of a curtain bonnet, which originated from Tokâra, a hat with a veil which ran around the sides and back and would fall on the shoulders. (Note: Tokara was a nation found outside the empire's borders, in the far northwest. This form of hat can also be considered a form of hufu) The veil was made of gauze-like material and could be adorned with jade and kingfisher feathers. However, the Emperor Gaozong was not satisfied with those because these new adopted fashion allowed the exposure of women's face, and he wanted the burnoose to return and cover the face.

His imperial edicts were only effective for a short period of time as women started re-wearing the weimao, which covered their faces but allowed their clothing and bodies to be exposed. By the time of Wu Zetian's ascendancy, the weimao was back in fashion and had spread everywhere while the mili had gradually disappeared. By 705 AD, the mili had completely disappeared.

== Derivatives and influences ==
By the end of the Sui dynasty, the mili evolved into the weimao; the weimao only covered the face instead of the entire body. This change in fashion happened as it was no more necessary for women to hide their body; they were only required to hide their faces.

== See also ==
- Burqa
- Honggaitou (Chinese red bridal veil)
- Veil
- Hanfu
- Hufu
- Humao
- Hanfu headgear
- Liangmao
