= Damao (hat) =

Chinese round hat with high crown and wide brim

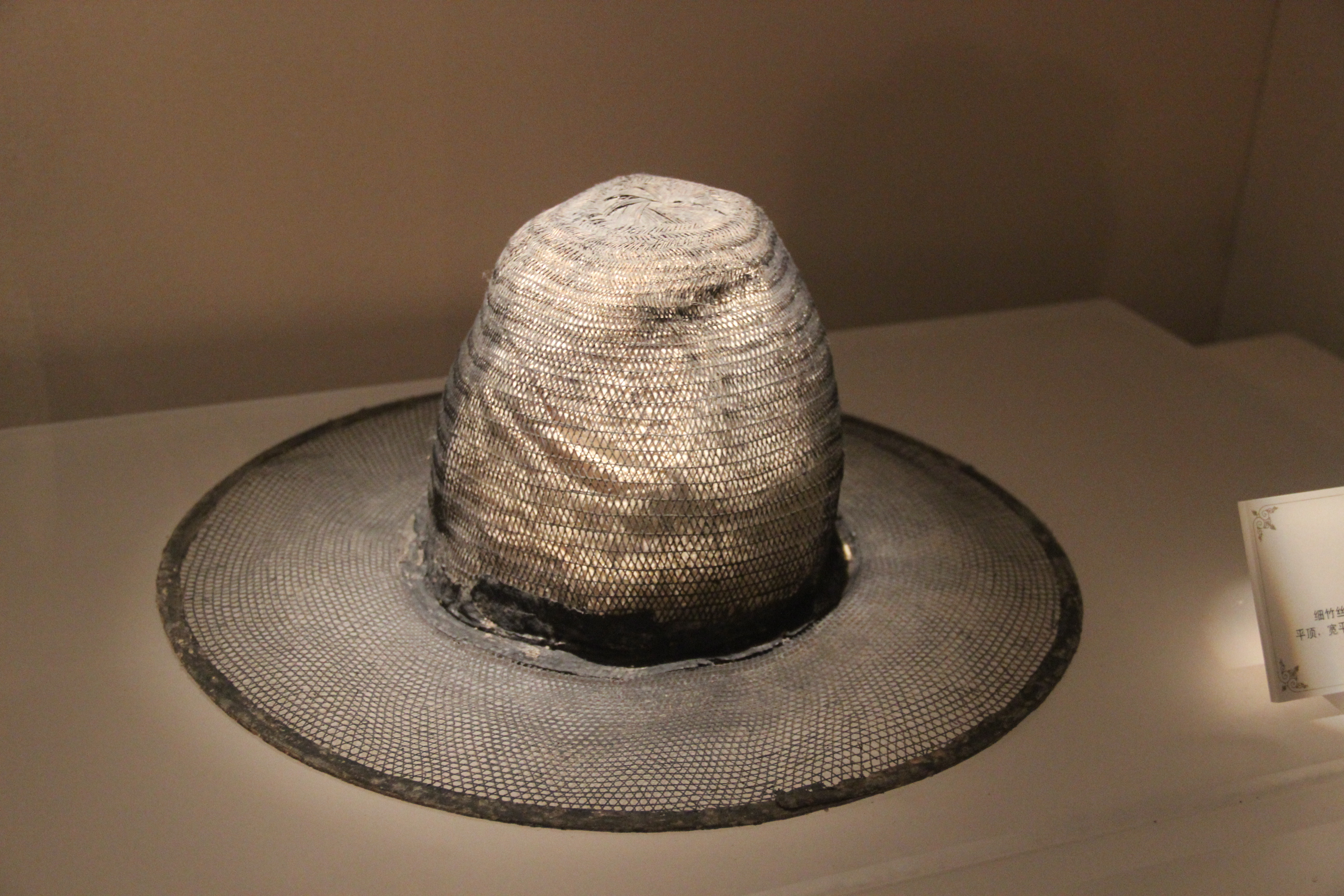
- Damao from the tomb of Prince Zhu Tan of Ming

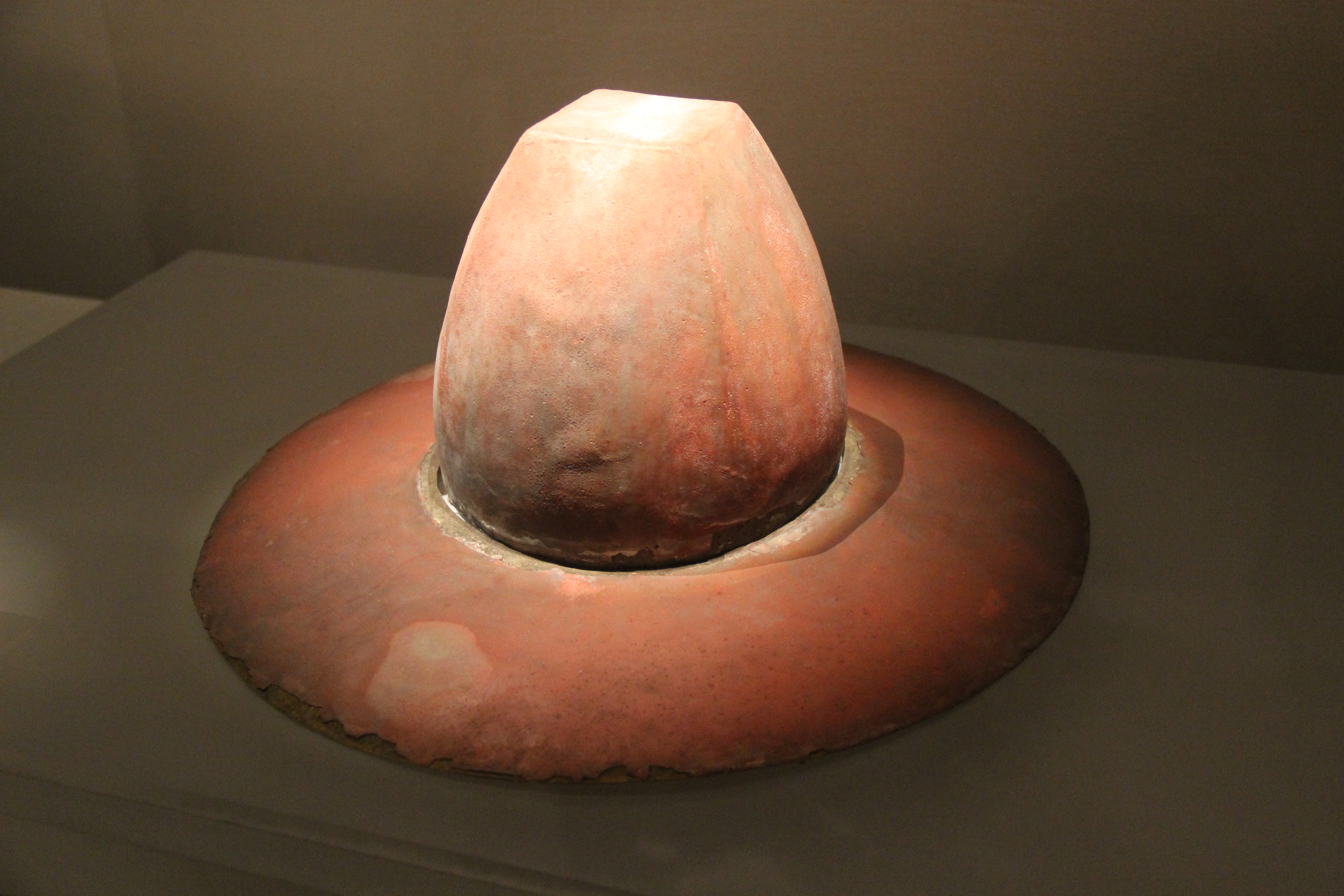
- Another form of damao from the tomb of Prince Zhu Tan of Ming
- Chinese: 大帽
- Literal meaning: Big hat
Transcriptions
Standard Mandarin
- Hanyu Pinyin: Dàmào

Damao (Chinese: 大帽; lit. 'Big hat'), is a type of Chinese round hat with a wide brim which was worn in the Ming dynasty. It was often worn by commoners of the Ming dynasty and is often seen in Ming dynasty portraits. It originated in the Yuan dynasty; it was derived from the Mongols' 'Boli hat' (钹笠帽; Boli mao).

== Design and construction ==
Damao is composed of a wide brim, a high crown and a long string which is used as a tie. It could be made from straw or fabric.

== History ==
=== Yuan dynasty ===
Boli hat (钹笠帽), a cymbal-shape hat with a round crown and with a brim which extended outwards and downwards, was one of the most popular hats worn by the Mongols (including the Yuan Emperors, officials and male commoners) in the Yuan dynasty. The use of boli hat by the ordinary Mongols in their everyday lives in the Yuan dynasty. This eventually influenced the Han Chinese.

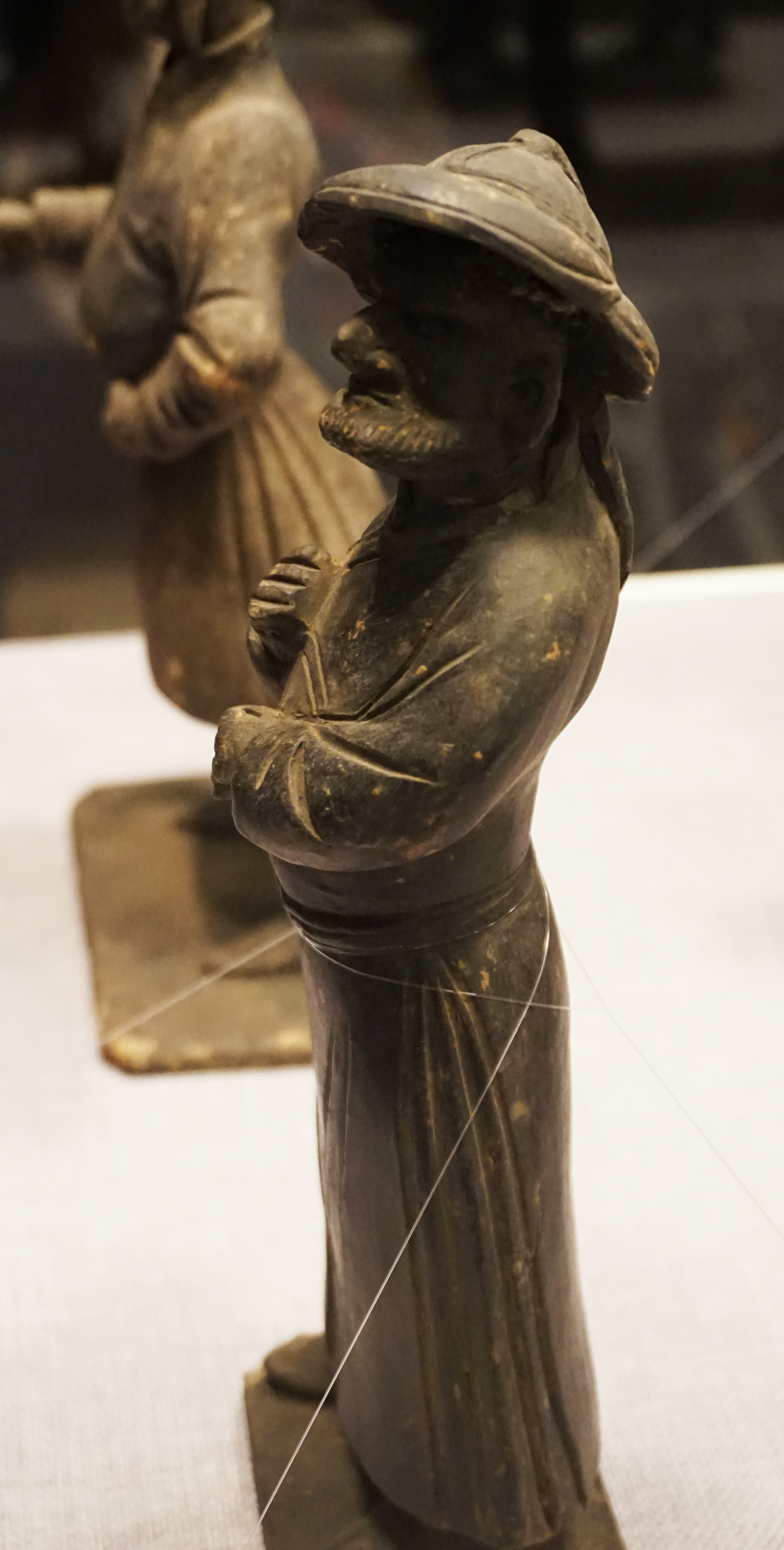
Figurine wearing a boli hat, Yuan dynasty.

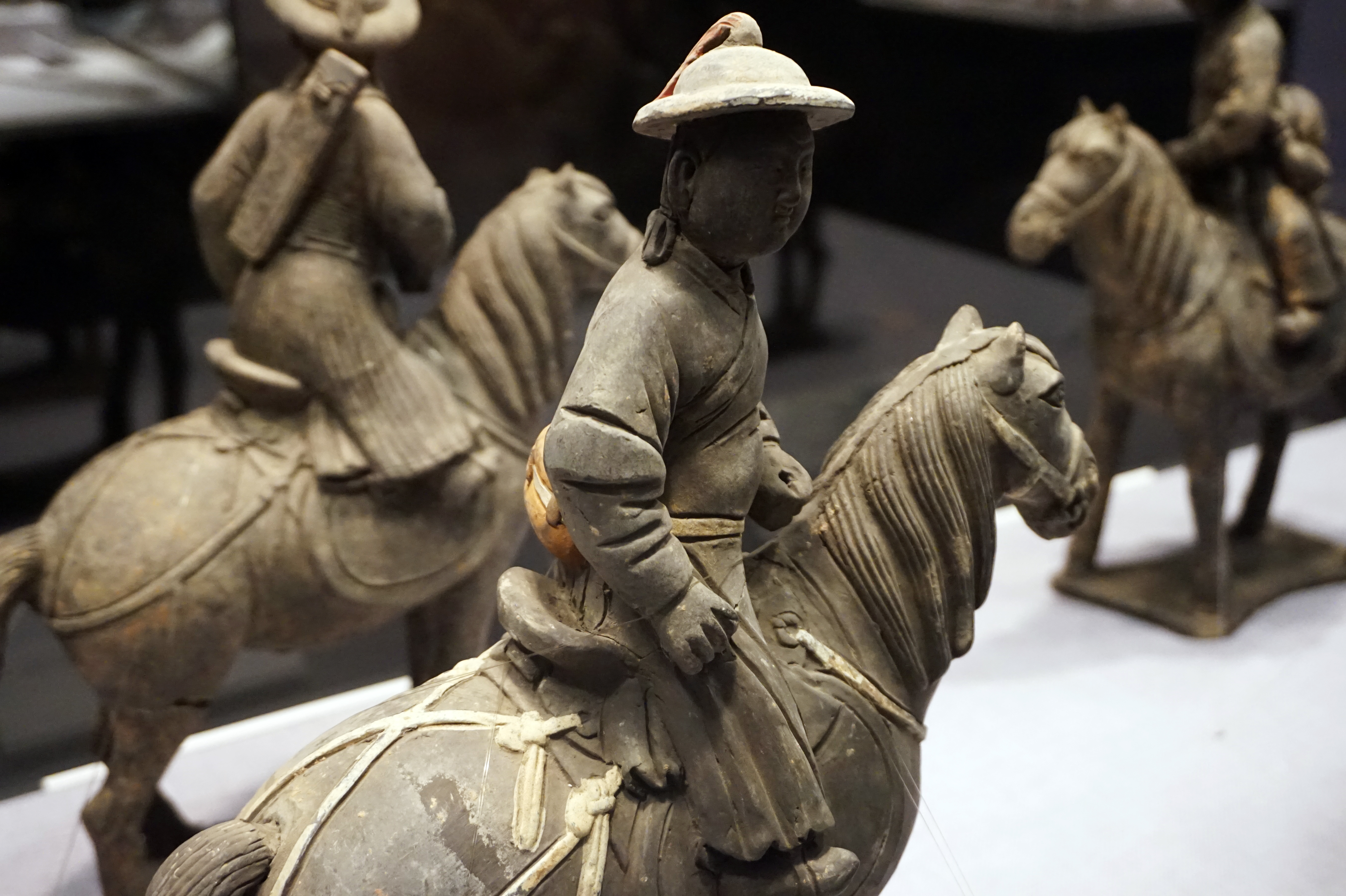

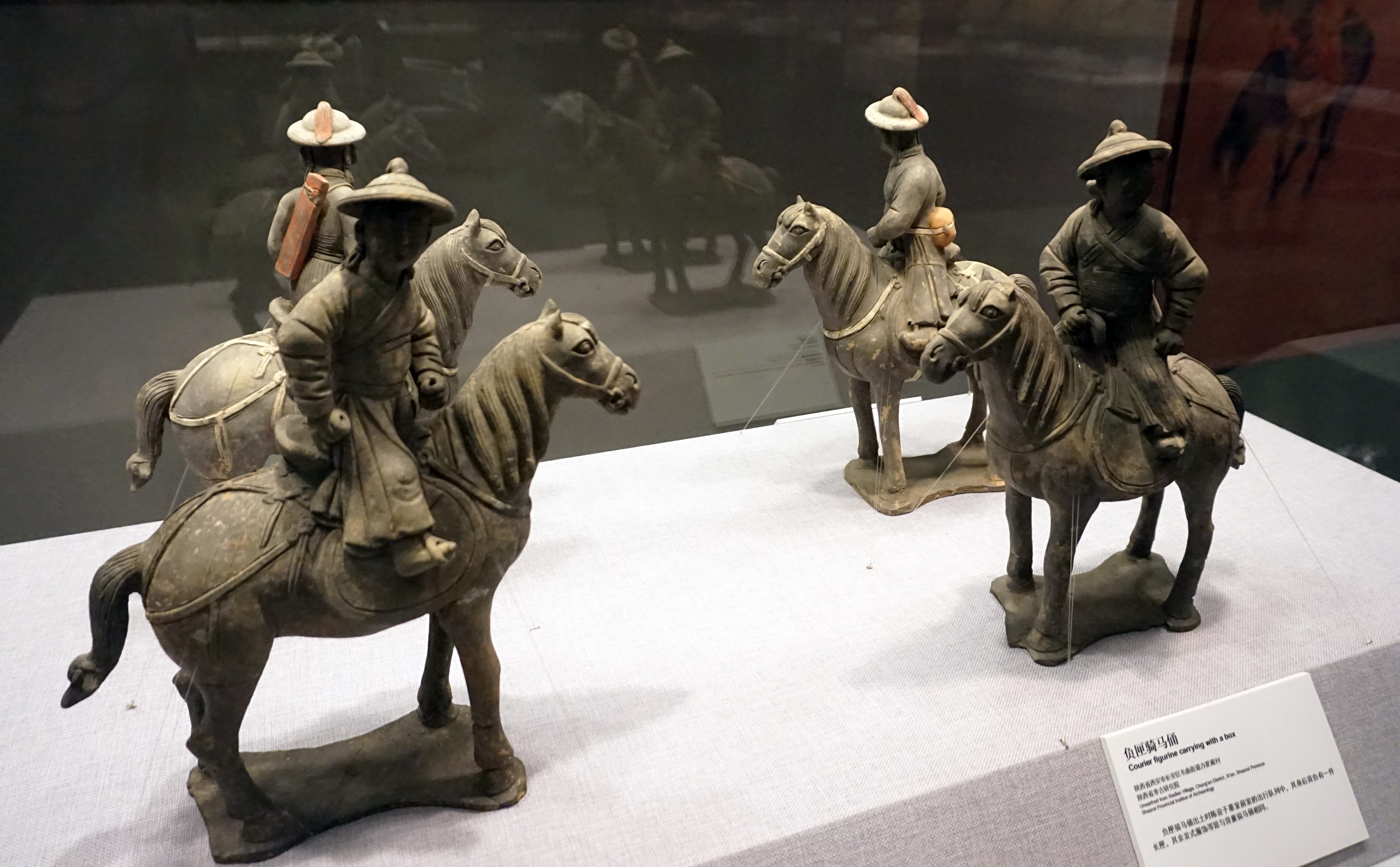

=== Ming dynasty ===
The boli hat continued to be used in the Ming dynasty where it was renamed damao in historical documents of the Ming dynasty, which may be because they were rounder and bigger than the futou had traditionally been worn by the Han Chinese. The damao was also widely worn by government clerks and family servants of the Ming officials and the Imperial family, and postmen (役使; yishi). The damao was one of the principal forms of men’s headwear during the Ming dynasty, worn by people across the social hierarchy, from the emperor to commoners. It also served as an important form of formal headwear for Ming men, functioning much like a dress hat. A damao made of rattan called chanzongmao (缠棕帽) is also used by military men, sometimes decorated with feathers attached on top of the hat.

The damao was also frequently bestowed as a gift upon neighboring tribes and tributary states, a practice extensively documented in the Ming Shilu (Veritable Records of the Ming Dynasty).

The damao also appeared in the Ming dictionary, Sancai Tuhui, where it is depicted and is called damao; according to the accompanying text in the Sancai Tuhui: in the early Ming dynasty, the emperor saw the imperial examinees sitting under the sun; therefore he ordered a damao hat for each of the examinees to be worn so that they would be protected from the sun. Since then, the hat was used by kegong (科貢), i.e. nominees for offices.

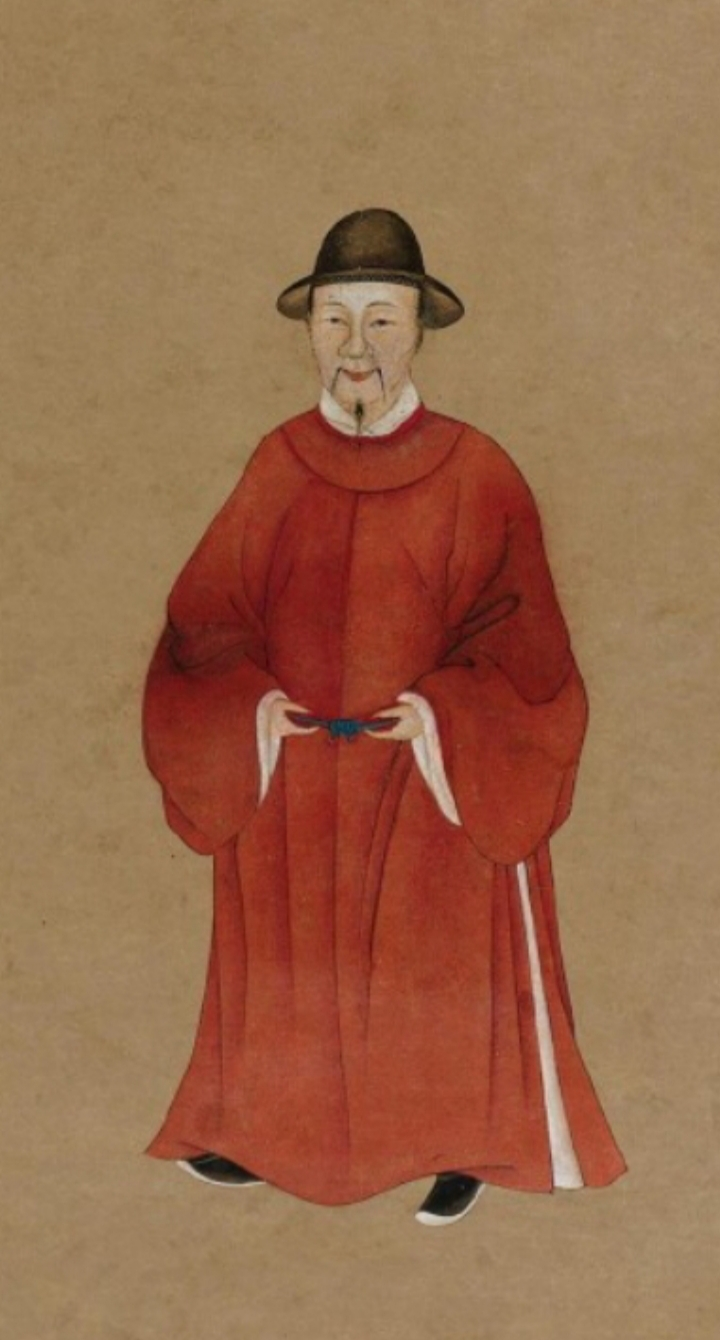

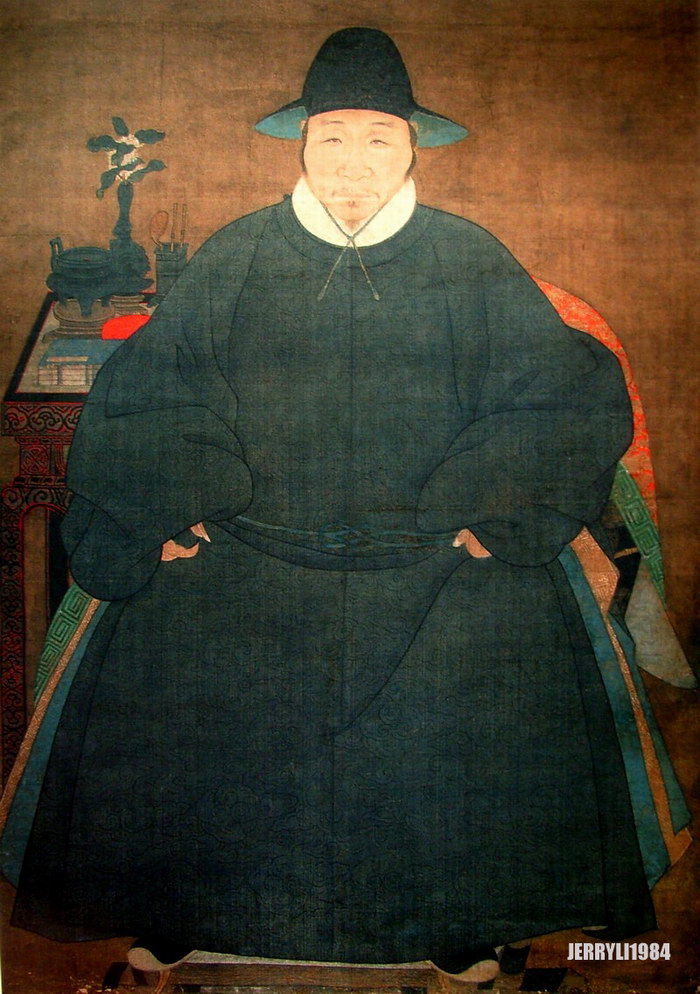
Portrait of a man wearing damao, Ming dynasty

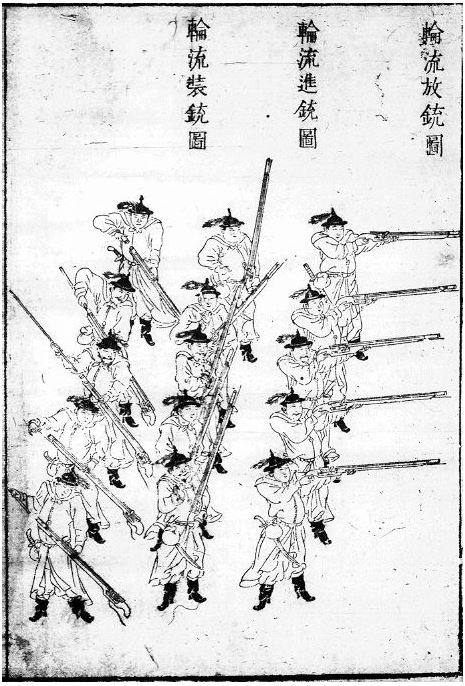
Ming musketeers wearing chanzongmao.

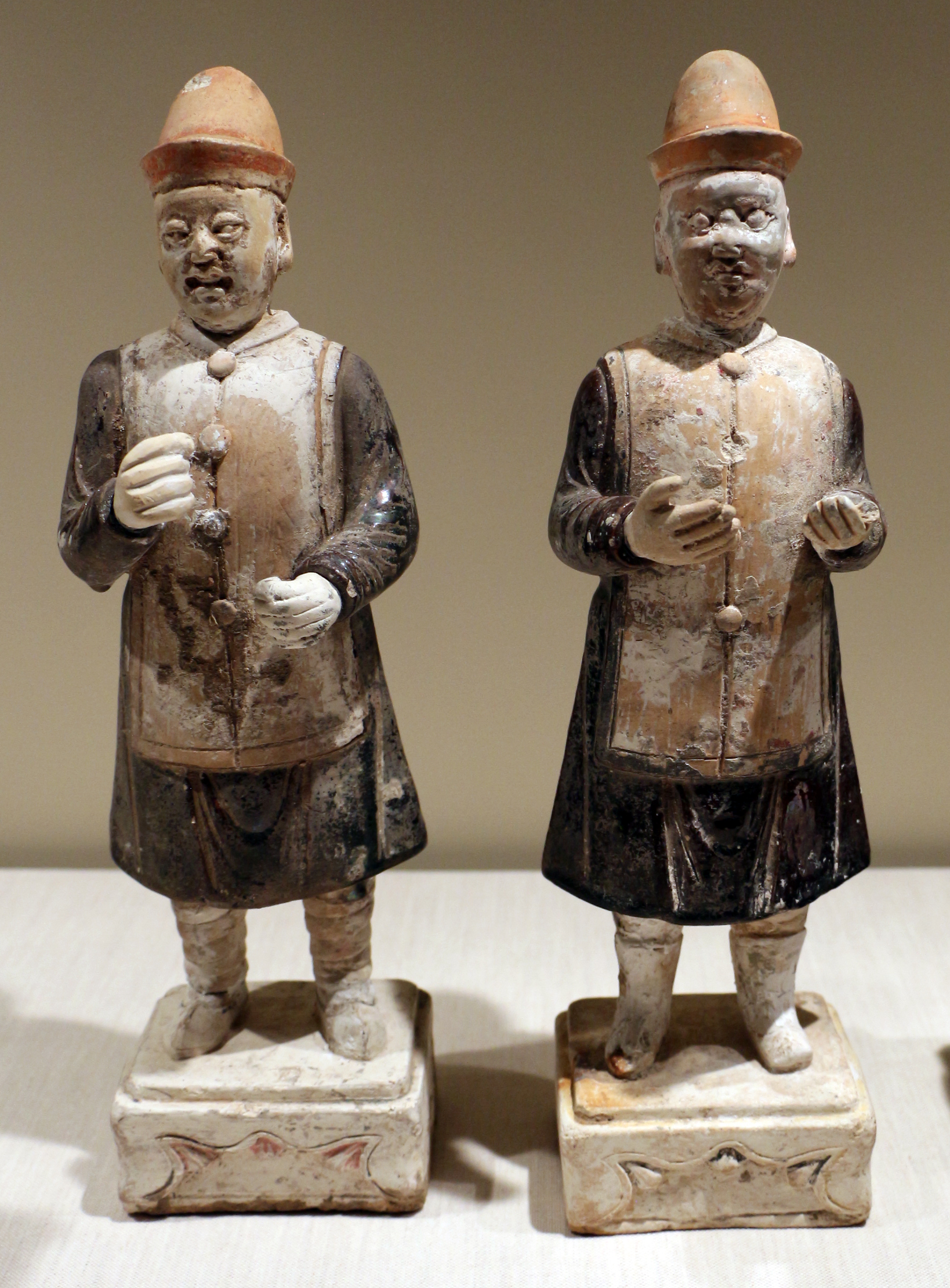
Ming dynasty pottery figures wearing damao.

== Similar items ==
- Humao
- Weimao
- Gat – A traditional Korean hat

== See also ==
- List of hat styles
- Hanfu
- Hufu
- Hanfu headgear
