= Humao =

Veil-less hat in the Tang dynasty

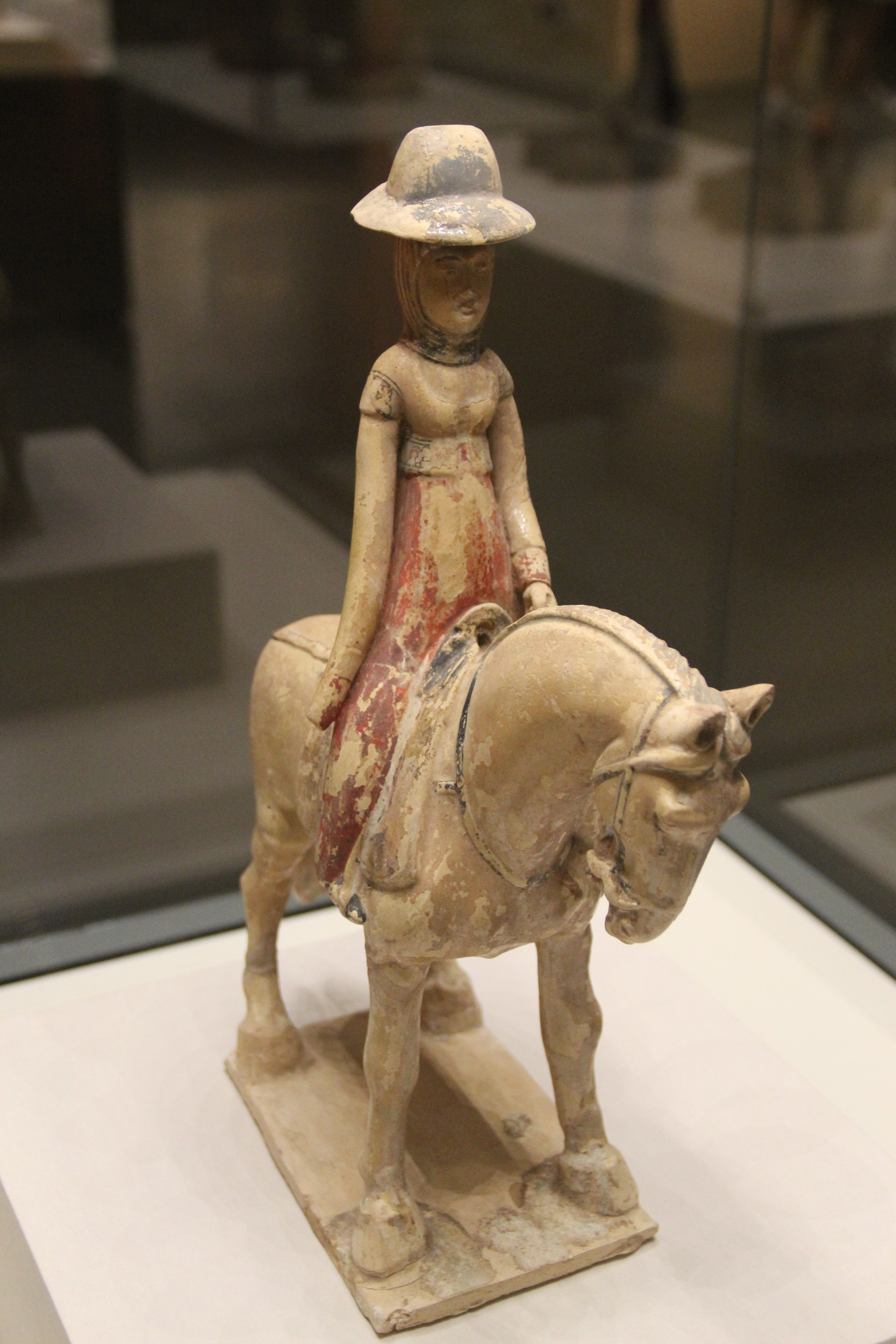
- A female rider wearing the humao (veil-less hat) and a form of hood (mili)
- Chinese: 胡帽
- Literal meaning: Barbarian hat
Transcriptions
Standard Mandarin
- Hanyu Pinyin: Húmào

Humao (Chinese: 胡帽; lit. 'Barbarian hat') is a type of brim hat which was used in the Tang dynasty by both Chinese men and women when horse-riding. Women of all social ranks (ranging from palace ladies to commoners) wore humao when horse-riding since the beginning of the Kaiyuan period (713–741 AD), during the Mid-Tang dynasty. The humao was a type of veil-less hat (which contrasted to the weimao); therefore, it allowed for the faces and hair to be exposed.

== Gallery ==
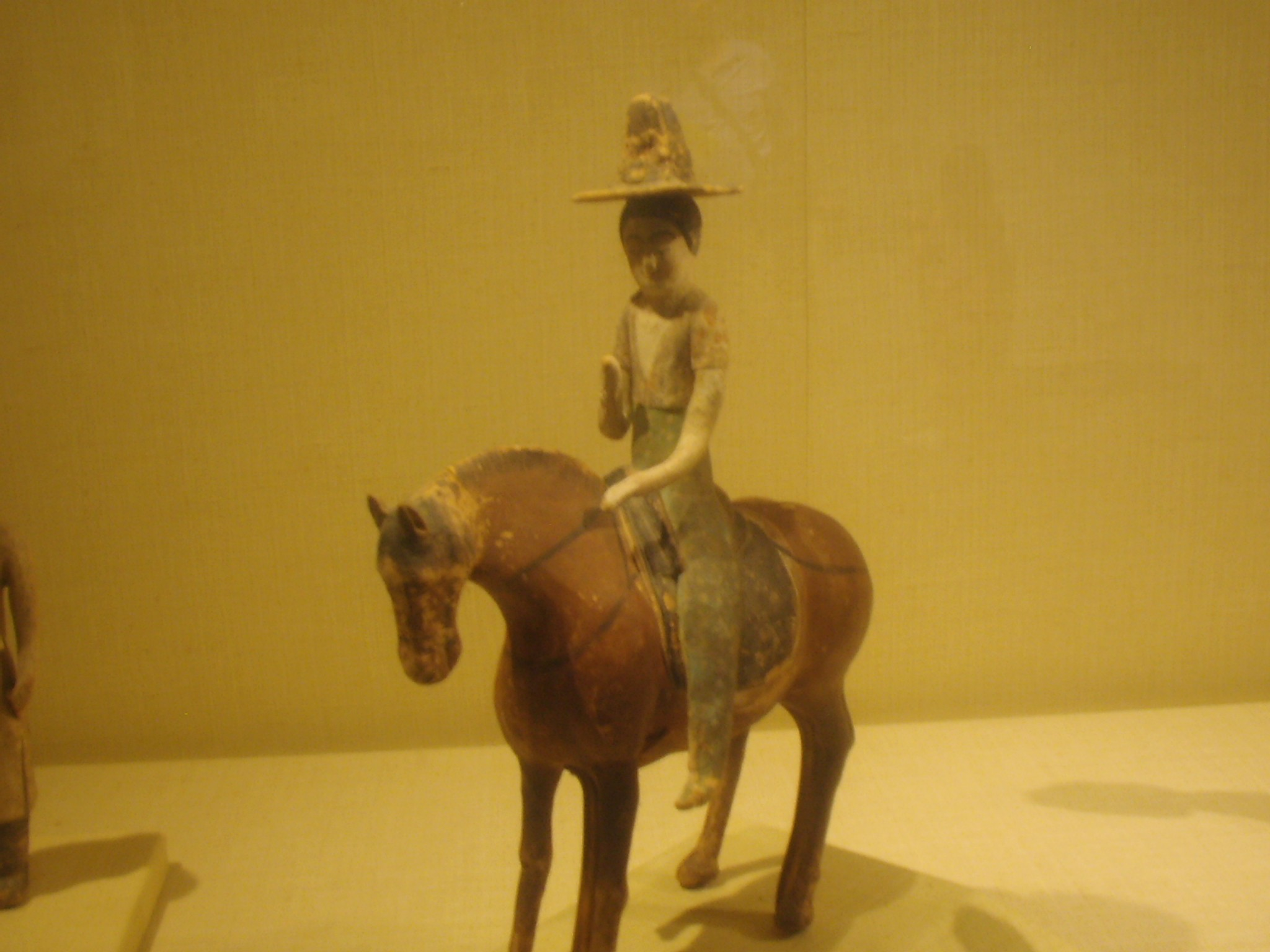

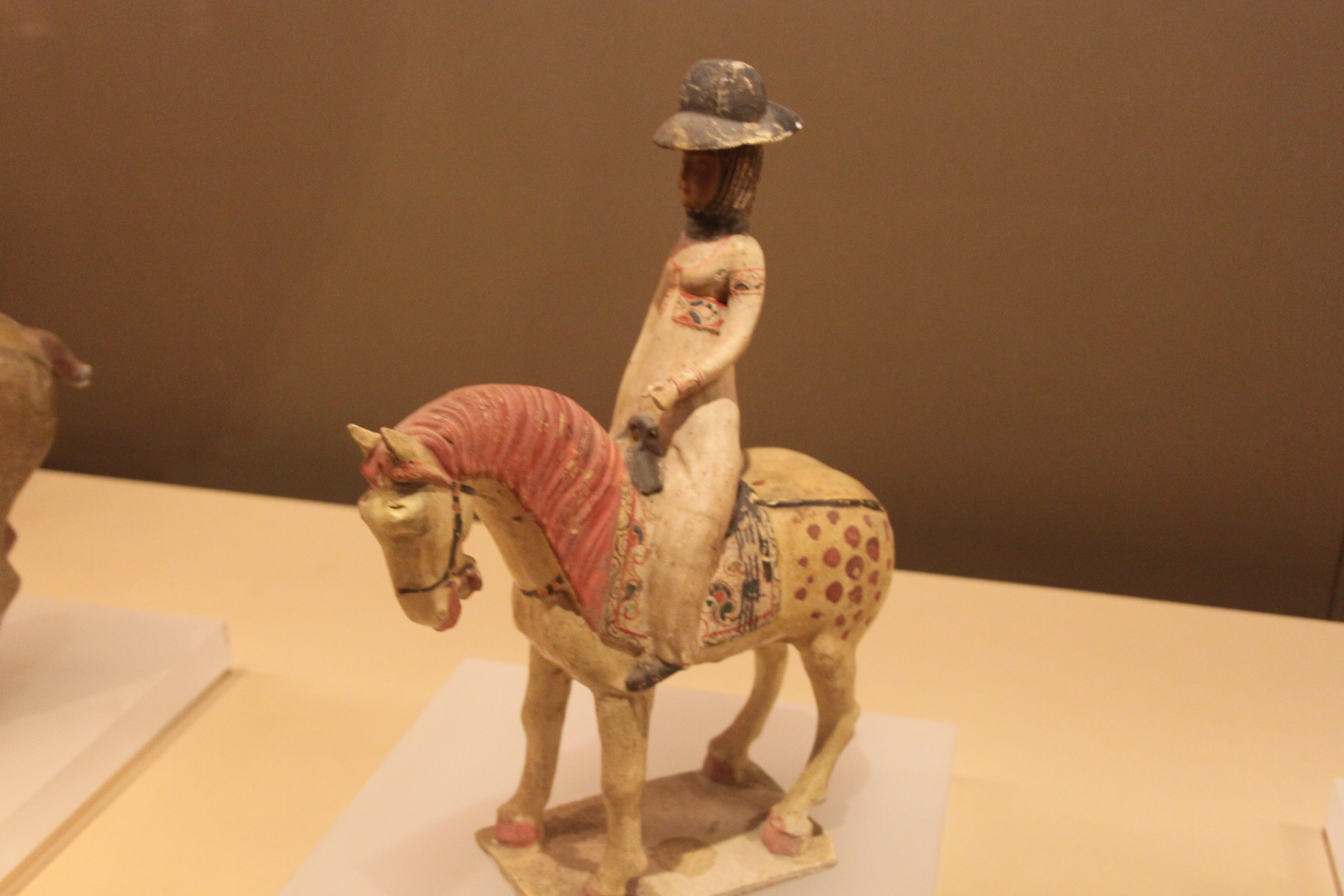

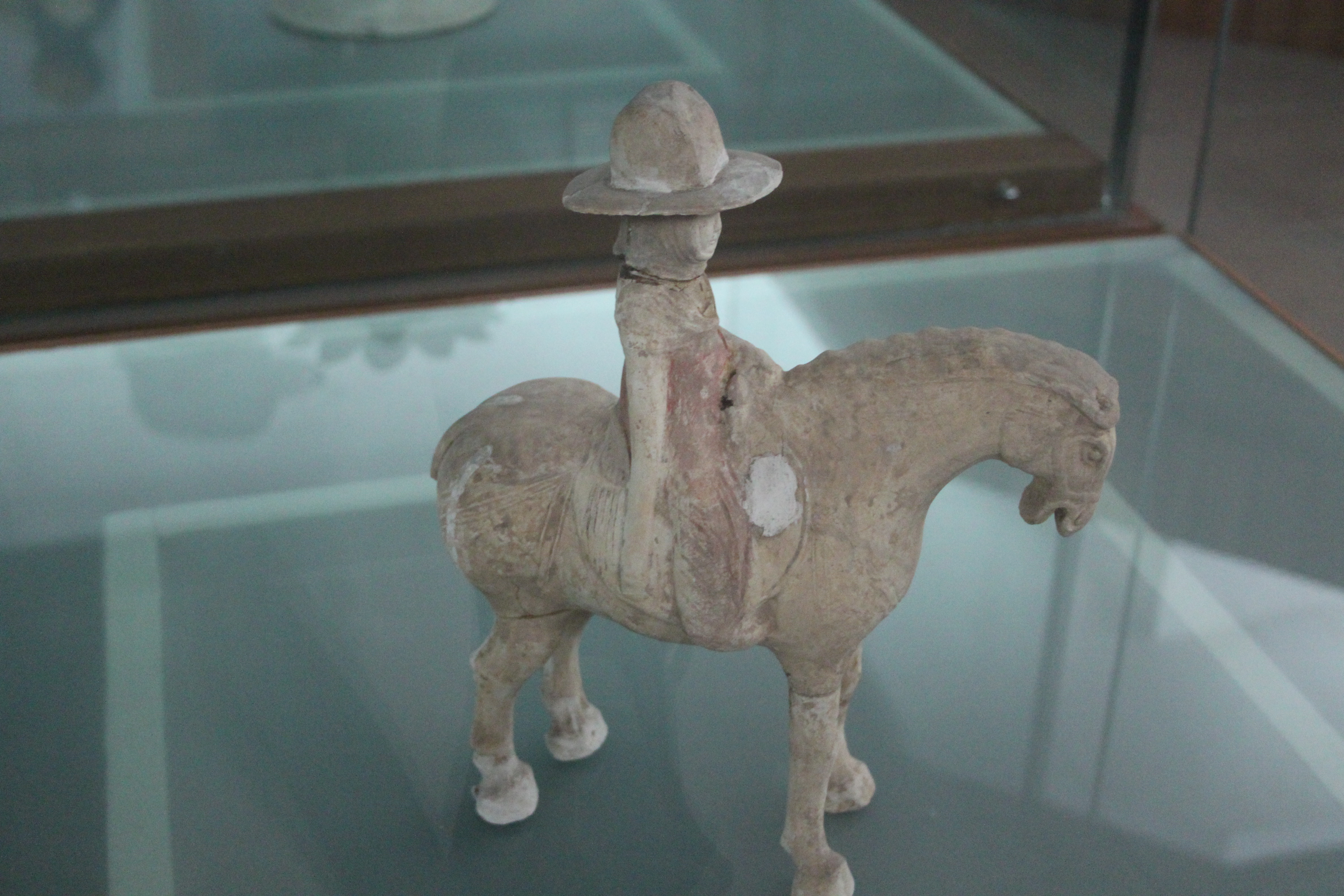

== Similar items ==
- Damao (hat)
- Gat
- Weimao

== See also ==
- Hanfu
- Hufu
- Hanfu headgear
- List of hats and headgear
- Liangmao
- Mili (veil)
