= Nina Doroshina =

Soviet and Russian actress (1934–2018)

Nina Doroshina PAR
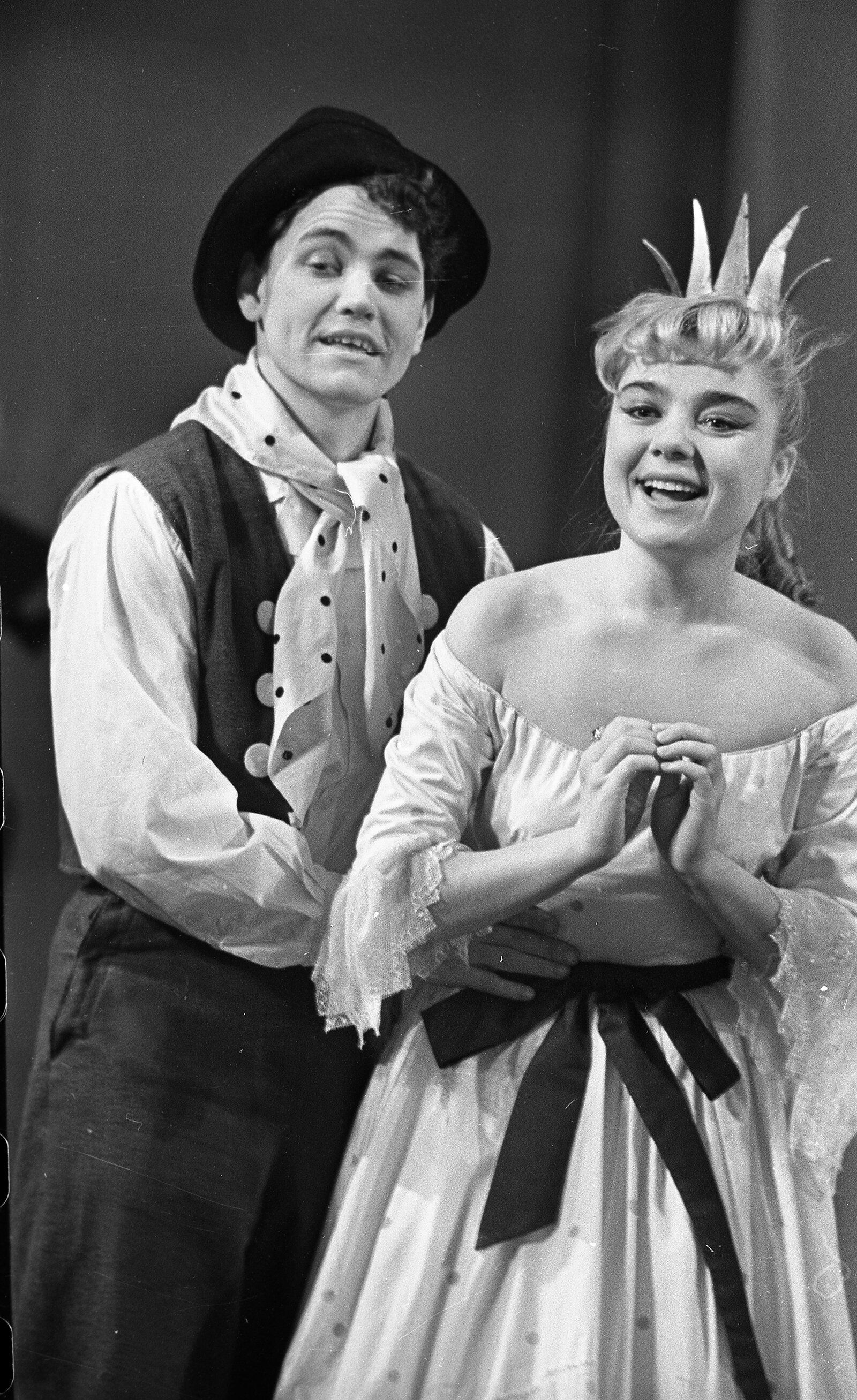
- Vladimir Zemlyanikin and Nina Doroshina in 1960s
- Born: Nina Mikhaylovna Doroshina; 3 December 1934; Losinoostrovsk, Moscow Oblast, Russian SFSR, USSR
- Died: 21 April 2018 (aged 83); Moscow, Russia
- Occupations: actress, pedagogue
- Years active: 1955–2018
- Title: People's Artist of the RSFSR (1985)
- Spouse(s): Oleg Dahl (divorce); Vladimir Tyshkov (his death in 2004)

Nina Mikhaylovna Doroshina (Russian: Нина Михайловна Дорошина; 3 December 1934 — 21 April 2018) was a Soviet and Russian actress of theater and cinema, People's Artist of the RSFSR (1985).

== Personal life ==
Doroshina was born in Losinoostrovsk, Moscow Oblast, in what was then the Russian Soviet Federative Socialist Republic, in the Soviet Union. She was married twice. Her first husband was the actor Oleg Dahl. They married in 1963, but the marriage soon disintegrated. Her second marriage was to Vladimir Tyshkov, a lighting designer in the Sovremennik Theatre; they lived together for about 20 years, until Tyshkov's death in 2004. Doroshina died in Moscow on 21 April 2018.

== Filmography ==
Year	Title	Role	Notes
1956	The First Echelon	Nelly Panina	
1956	A Crazy Day	Shura	
1956	Man was Born	Sima	
1957	A Unique Spring	Nina	
1957	They Met Along the Way	Lena Krapivina	
1958	Close to Us	Lyuba Zvonaryova	
1958	Happiness Must Be Protected	Olga	
1960	People on the Bridge	Oksana	
1961	Lyubushka	Klanka	
1961	End of Old Beryozovka	Liza Kurashova	
1962	Artist from Kokhanovka	Olesya Yakovenko	
1963	The First Trolleybus	Dasha	
1965	Lushka	Lyalka	
1966	The Bridge Is Built	Sasha Malashkina	
1966	Alyshka's Hunt	Alyosha's mom	
1973	Responsible for Everything	Olga Nosova	
1978	For Family Reasons	retired actress	
1985	Love and Pigeons	Nadya	
1989	Don't You Like Our Government?!	Elena Alexandrovna	(final film role)

== Awards ==
- Honored Artist of the RSFSR (1970)
- People’s Artist of the RSFSR (1985)
- Order of Honour (2006)
- Order of Friendship (2010)
