= Izolda Izvitskaya =

Soviet actress

- Born: Izolda Vasilyevna Izvitskaya; 21 June 1932; Dzerzhinsk, Russian Soviet Federative Socialist Republic, USSR
- Died: 1 March 1971 (aged 38); Moscow, USSR
- Occupation: Actress

Izolda Vasilyevna Izvitskaya (Russian: Изо́льда Васи́льевна Изви́цкая, 21 June 1932 – 1 March 1971) was a Soviet actress.

Isolda Izvitskaya was born in the small town of Dzerzhinsk, Russia. Her father was a chemist, her mother a teacher. Upon leaving high school she enrolled at VGIK (the All-Union State Institute of Cinematography). She was given small parts in several movies while still a student. In 1955 Izvitskaya was chosen for the lead in The Forty-First, a film based on a short story by Boris Lavrenyov. The film was very successful all over the country and in 1957 it was shown at the Cannes Film Festival where it was very well received. A new café in Paris was named after her.

At home Izvitskaya was made a member of the Association for Cultural Relations with Latin American countries; this gave her the opportunity to travel outside of the USSR.

Izvitskaya starred in several more movies; however, none of them achieved the success of The Forty-First. She made several more attempts to work in films but parts were getting smaller and scarcer, and she became depressed. In 1971 her husband, the actor Eduard Bredun, left her. She had a nervous breakdown and locked herself in her apartment in Moscow. She was found dead in her home, which was empty of any food. Her husband insisted that the obituary state "poisoning with an unknown substance" as the cause of death but according to the BBC Russian Service she died of starvation.

== Filmography ==
Year	Title	Role	Notes
1954	Bogatyr Goes to Marteau	Nastenka	
1955	Troubled Youth	Ketrin	
1955	Good Morning	Masha Komarova	
1956	The First Echelon	Anna Zalogina	
1956	The Forty-First	Soldier Maria Filatovna	
1957	The Poet	Olga, communist agent	
1957	A Unique Spring	Anna Burova	
1957	The Communist	episode	
1958	To the Black Sea	Irina Kruchinina	
1958	Another Flight	Ksenia	
1959	Fathers and Sons	Fenichka	
1960	A Man Changes Skin	Maria Polozova	
1961	Peace to Him Who Enters	Klava	
1962	Chain Reaction	Nadya Vorobyova	
1962	Armageddon		
1966	On Thin Ice	Oksana	
1967	Avdotya Pavlovna	Nyura, Avdotya's girlfriend	
1969	Every Night at Eleven	Zhenya	(final film role)
