= Futou =

Chinese headwear

Futou/Putou
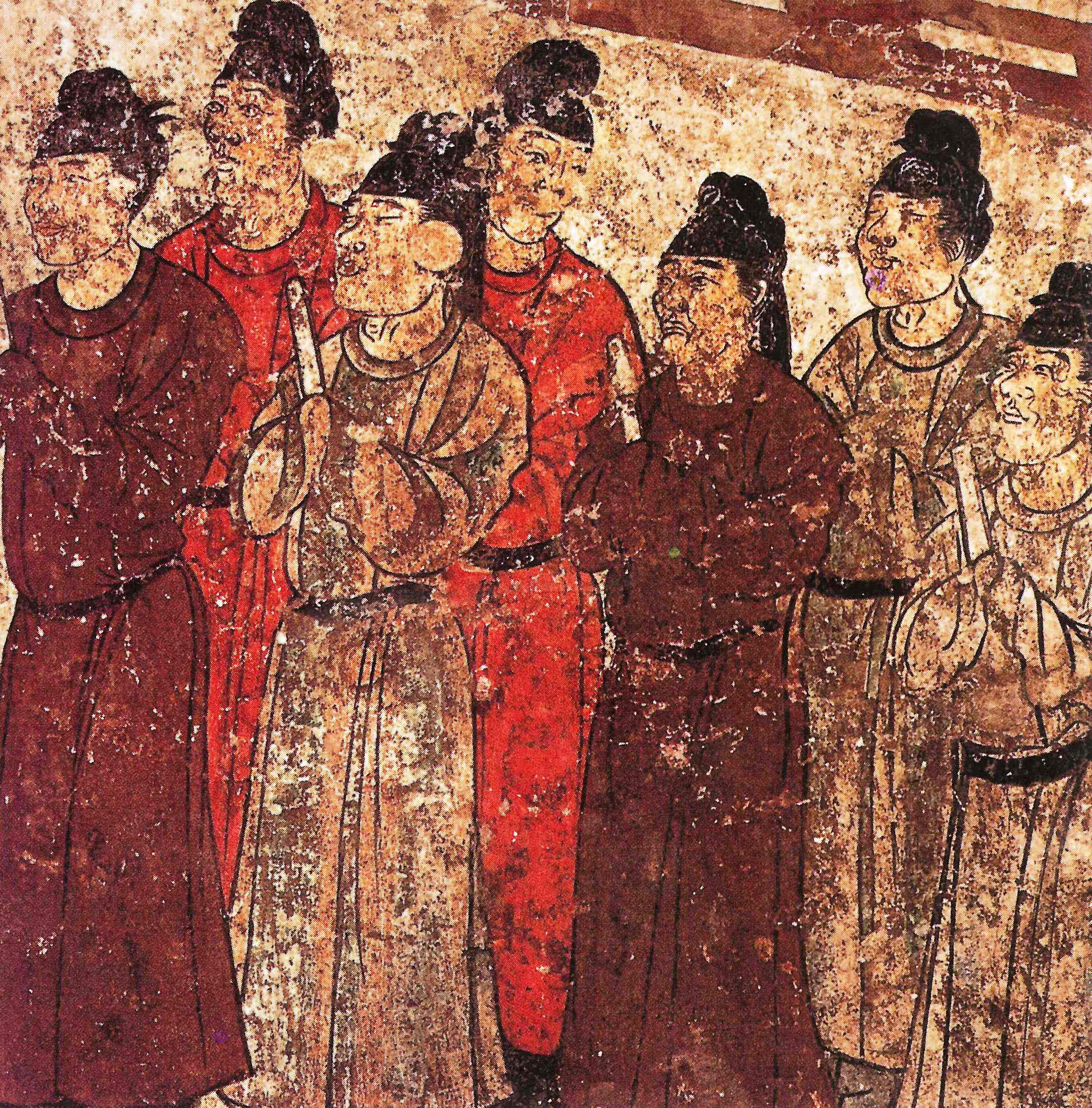
- Eunuchs wearing yuanlingshan and futou, Tang dynasty

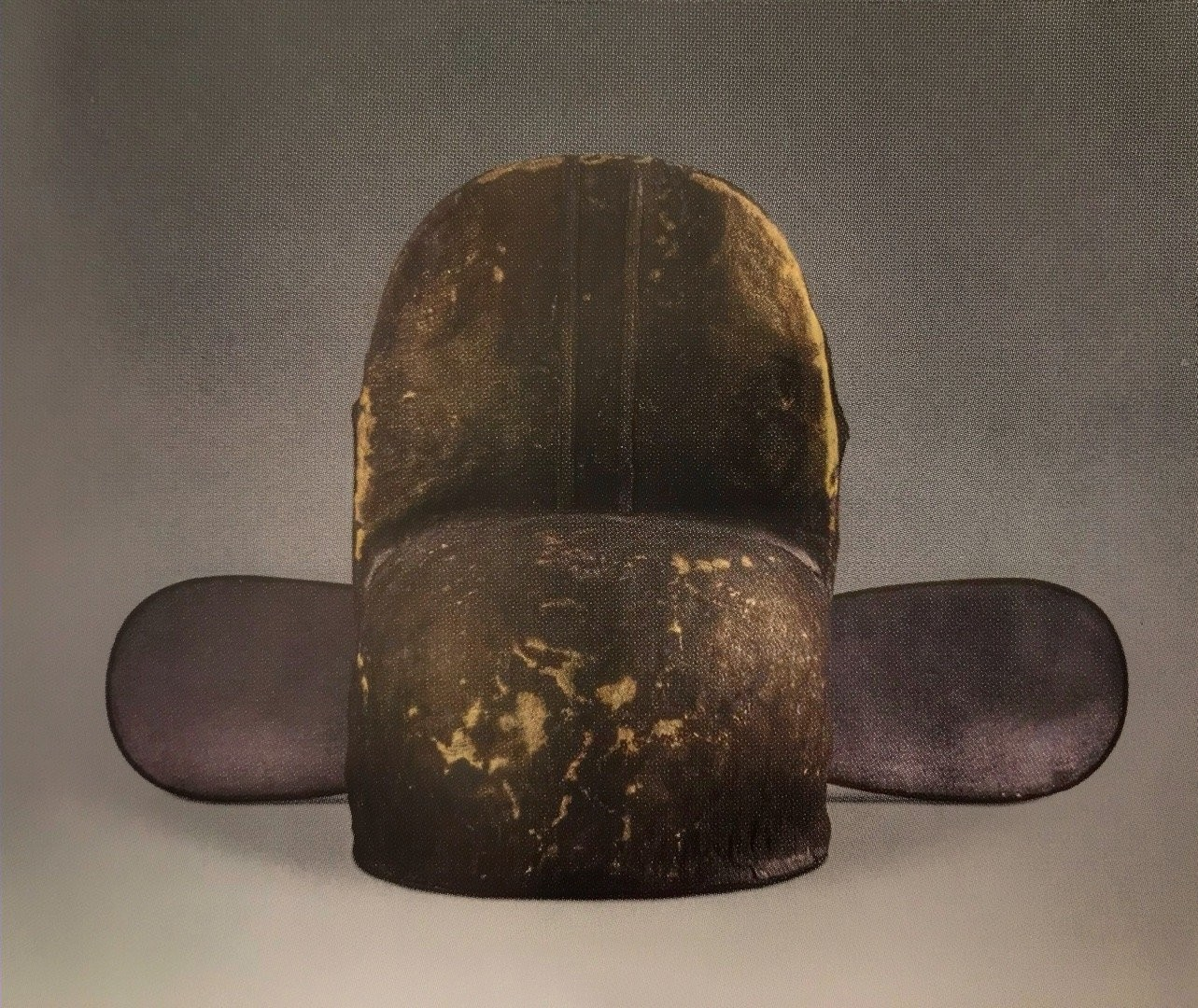
- Wushamao (a type of futou), housed in Shanghai Museum
- Traditional Chinese: 襆頭/幞頭
- Simplified Chinese: 幞头
- Literal meaning: Scarf head
Transcriptions
Standard Mandarin
- Hanyu Pinyin: fútóu, pútóu

Futou (simplified Chinese: 幞头; traditional Chinese: 襆頭/幞頭; also putou (幞头; 襆頭 or 幞頭), fu (幞) and toujin (頭巾), was one of the most important forms of Chinese headwear in ancient China with a history of more than one thousand years. The futou first appeared in the Tang and Song dynasties. The futou was typically worn by government officials. The futou was originally turban-like headwear which was tied at the back of its wearer's head, with the two corners going to opposite directions and acting as decorations. From the Sui to the Ming dynasties, the futou evolved and was developed based on the fujin. The futou eventually came to assume a variety of shapes and styles. The shape of the futou worn by the government officials in the Song and Ming dynasties, the latter known as the wushamao (烏紗帽), was based on the futou of the Tang dynasty.

The futou was also introduced in both Unified Silla and Balhae and continued to be worn by government officials until the late Joseon. The futou with a jinzi (lining) was also introduced back in the Sogdian areas in Central Asia spreading to the Western regions through the Xinjiang region. The futou with jinzi was also introduced in Japan during the Nara period through Prince Shōtoku. Đại Cồ Việt was introduced to the futou in the late 10th century and adapted various iterations from the Early Lê to the Nguyễn dynasty.

== Terminology ==
The term futou (or putou (幞头; 襆頭 or 幞頭) means "head scarf" or "head-cloth". According to the Mufuyanxianlu by Bi Zhongxun, the original meaning of futou was to "cover one's head with a black cloth" before the Sui dynasty.

The English term "feet", which is used to describe the hard ribbons used in the futou, is called jiǎo (脚; 腳; 'feet')).

The jīnzi (巾子) refers to a lining used inside the futou; it began to be used in 614 AD, and its purpose was to make the futou look more straight and beautiful in terms of appearance.

== History ==
=== Origins ===
There are varying opinions on the origins of the futou in the literature. According to Chinese scholar Sun Ji in From Futou to Turban (從幞頭到頭巾; Cóng fútóu dào tóujīn), the futou first appeared in the 3rd century AD and was based on the headdress of a northern tribe.

Guzel Maitdinova proposed in 1990 that the futou may have been developed from hats worn in ancient Central Asia and was brought in by the Turks from Sogdiana to Tokharistan to China, based on information provided by Hsen Kuo, an 11th-century Chinese annalist:

"The Chinese clothes and hats, starting from the time of Northern Qi dynasty represents a barbarian costume".

It is also proposed by Yatsenko that the futou was part of the Chinese male costume.

=== Wei, Jin, Northern and Southern dynasties ===
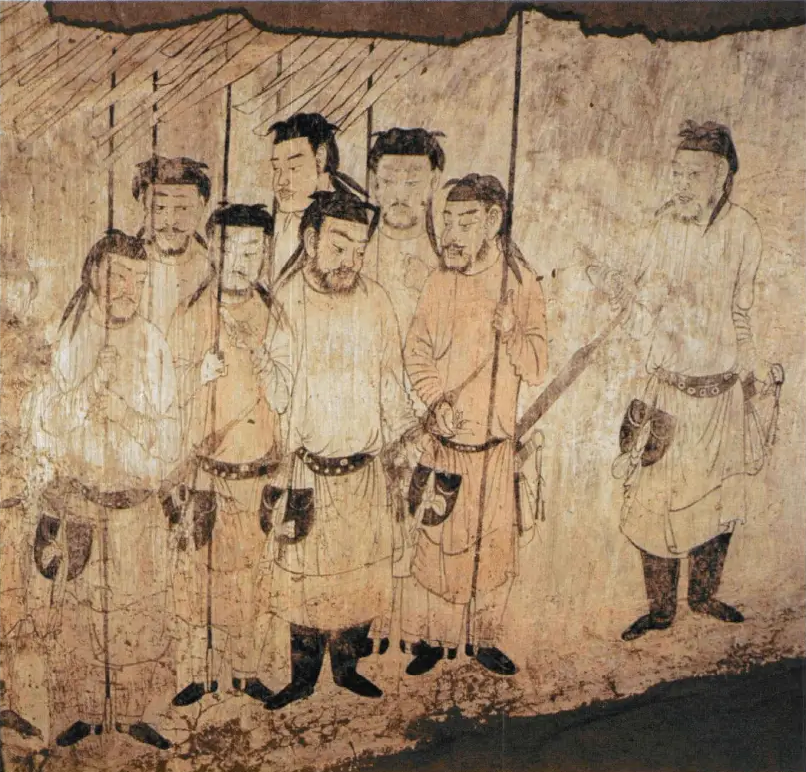
Sui dynasty mural showing guards wearing early futou, from Shuicun, Tongguan, Shaanxi.

The origins of the futou in China can be traced back to the reign of Emperor Wu in Northern Zhou, who had wrapped his head with a futou with four ribbons, called sìjiǎo (四腳; 'four feet')) or zhéshàngjīn (折上巾; 'folding-up scarf')); two of those ribbons were tied at the back and left hanging down, while the other two were tied inversely at the top of the head. According to the Tongdian, Emperor Wu created the sijiao by cutting the fujin. According to ancient texts, Emperor Wu created the futou to protect the hair of his generals and soldiers in battles.

The futou first appeared a type of kerchief made by cutting a piece of muslin fabric into the proper size and by attaching four long and wide ribbons at each corner of the fabric like four feet. This futou was large enough to cover all the hair of its wearer, and when it was worn, a kerchief had to be placed on the top of its wearer's head. Two of these ribbons were tied on the forehead while the other two were tied at the back of the wearer's head and was left hanging down. Prior to the Sui dynasty, the futou was a black piece of cloth.

=== Sui, Tang dynasty, and Five dynasties and ten kingdoms period ===
==== Tang dynasty ====
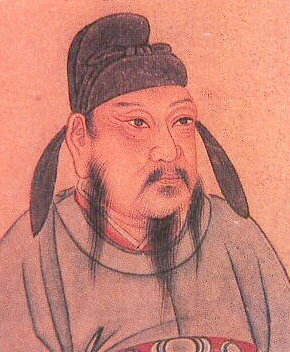
Example of Tang dynasty futou

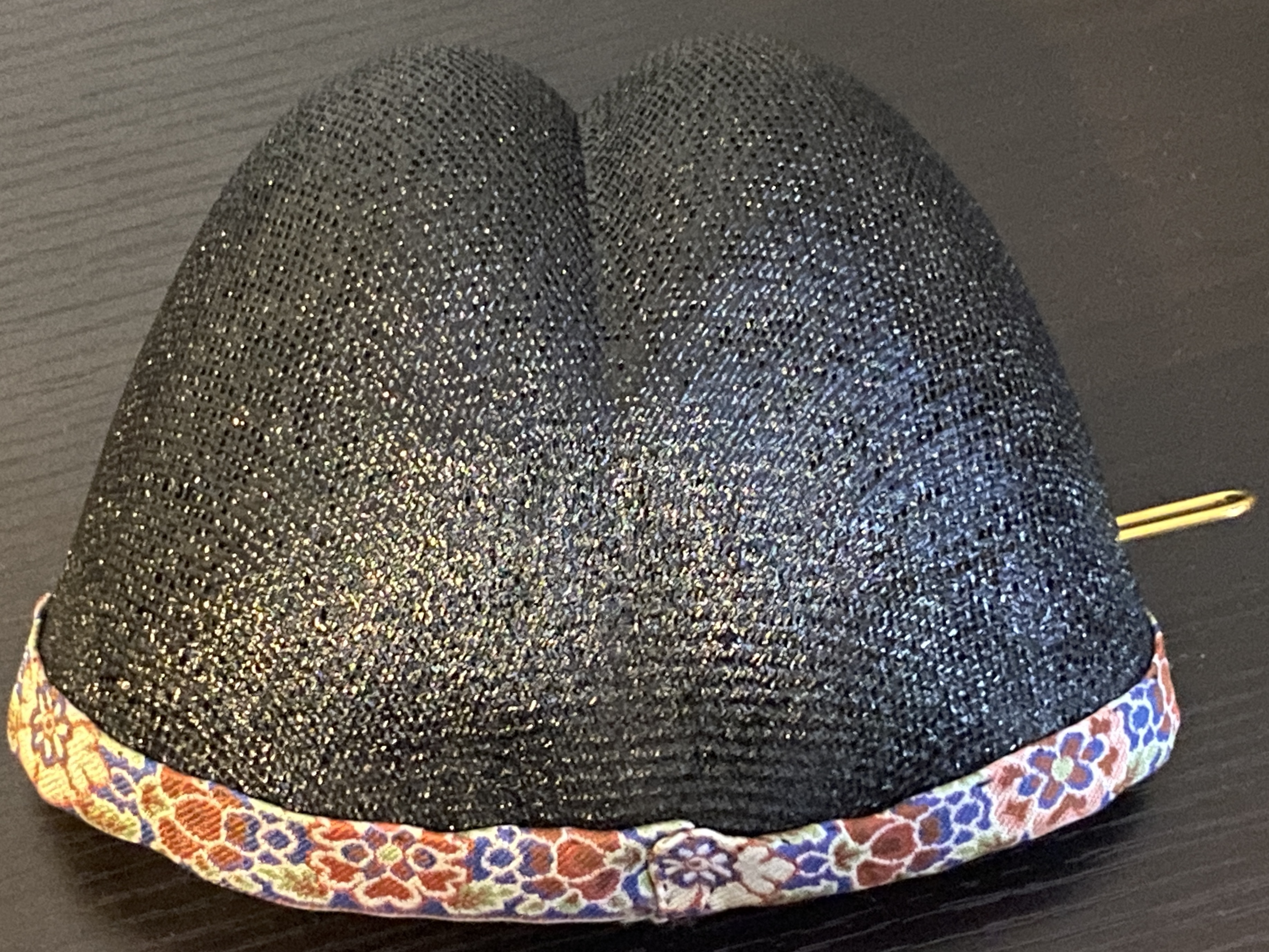
Jinzi-lining worn with the futou

Prior to the Song dynasty, the futou was mostly made of black muslin. In the early Tang, the futou was a sijiaoruanjin (四腳軟巾; 'Four-feet soft scarf'), where all four ribbons were allowed to hang down after being tied. Later on, the early Tang dynasty minister, Ma Zhou, was the first person to use a square kerchief in order to tie a futou and was also the person who added a lining to shape his futou making it more beautiful. The lining which was added to the inside of the futou from the year 614 AD was called jinzi (巾子); the jinzi was used to make the futou look more straight and beautiful in terms of appearance. After being cut into the desired shape, the jinzi was painted black with lacquer and would then be covered by the futou.

The jinzi was made with soft and light tung wood and with other materials such as bamboo strips, timbo, miscanthus, silk, and leather. It was also possible to line the futou with a mount-shaped item made out of paulownia (桐木为冠; Tóngmù wéi guān; 'paulownia crown') in the front. The step-by-step process to wear the futou with jinzi was to tie the hair up in a topknot, followed by covering the topknot with the jinzi as hard lining, then wrapping the head and the jinzi with a black, square-shaped piece of cloth, and finally tying the cloth in the desired style. The futou with jinzi then became the standard form of futou in the early Tang dynasty. A form of futou with jinzi was a kerchief with two corners attached with two ribbons in opposite directions of each other; the ribbons would then be tied at the back of the wearer's head, allowing the two back ribbons to hang down freely as a form of decoration. With time, the futou with jinzi was further developed, and a ribbon was attached to each corner of the turban to make it more decorative; two ribbons were tied on the top of the head while the back ribbons were tied and were allowed to hang down freely. The futou with jinzi could also have all four ribbons tied at the back of the head and allowed to hang down freely.

The yingwangboyang (英王踣样), a futou with a big and forward top jinzi, was created by Emperor Zhongzong and became prevalent during his reign when he awarded this type of futou to his officials. During the reign of Emperor Xuanzong, the neiyang (内样), a futou with a small and round top jinzi became popular around the year 726 AD. Moreover, by adding wire or silk strings inside the added ribbons, the futou could take different shapes and styles depending on its wearer's liking. However, in the Tang dynasty, only the Emperors could use these hard ribbons; these hard ribbons would be bent upward. The Tang dynasties emperor wore a futou with two upturned tails until the Five dynasties period. The Tang dynasty emperors also wore the zhíjiǎofútóu (直腳幞头; 'straight-feet futou').

Types of futou in the Tang dynasty
| Types of futou | Description | Pictures |
|---|---|---|
| Ruanjiao putou (软脚幞頭; 軟腳幞頭; ruǎnjiǎo fútóu; 'putou with soft legs') | A typical type of headwear in the Tang dynasty and was an important precursor to the futou developed in the succeeding dynasties. Sometimes, 2 or 4 narrow and long ribbons were tied to the back of the putou and were allowed to hang down freely down the back of its wearer | |
| Zheshang jin (折上巾; 'kerchief folded upward'), | A type of form of ruanjiao putou which consisted of square-piece of cloth wrap around the head; the two ends of the fabric were then tied at the back at either side of the neck and were then wrapped around the head before being together above the forehead. | |
| Chuijiao Putou (垂腳襆頭) | A black hat with two drooped down wing-like flaps. | |

==== Five dynasties and ten kingdoms period ====
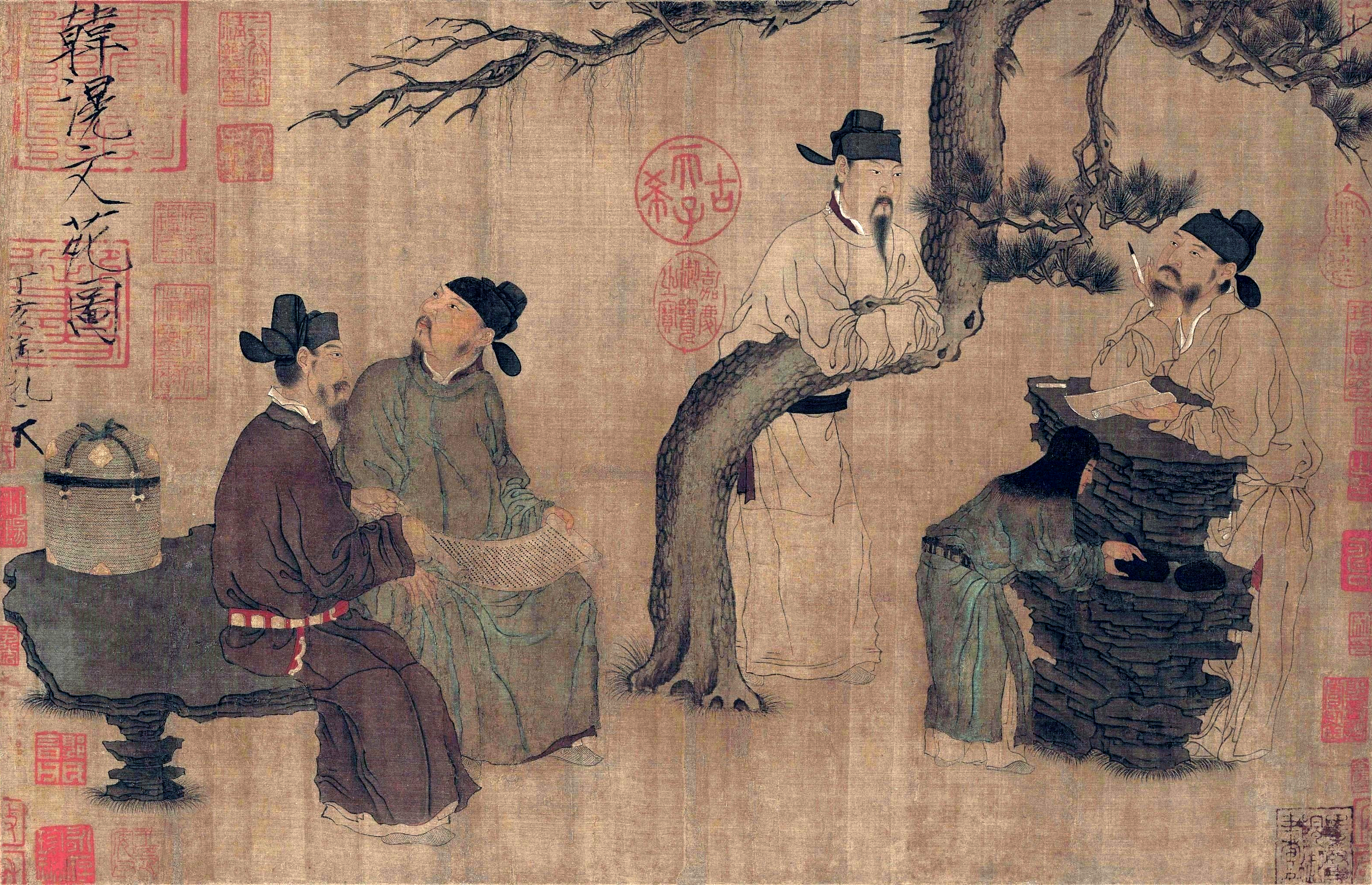
Futou worn by literati on Zhou Wenju's "Literary Garden" (文苑圖)

In the Five dynasties period, more styles of futou were created including the futou with wide feet which looked like fans or banana leaves which surrounded the front of the head; and the futou with curved feet which turned upwards before bending downward.

In the Ma Chu, painted silk was used in the futou. Ma Xifan also wore the horns of a dragon (龍角; lóngjiǎo; 'dragon horn'), a futou with extremely long feet on both sides.

During the Later Jin, Emperor Liu Min used a zhijiaofutou with long and straight feet which were more than one foot in length; the Song dynasty later kept the tradition of using this style of futou as a standard. It is also attested in the Song Shi that the futou had become straight and flat since the Five dynasties period.

=== Song dynasty ===
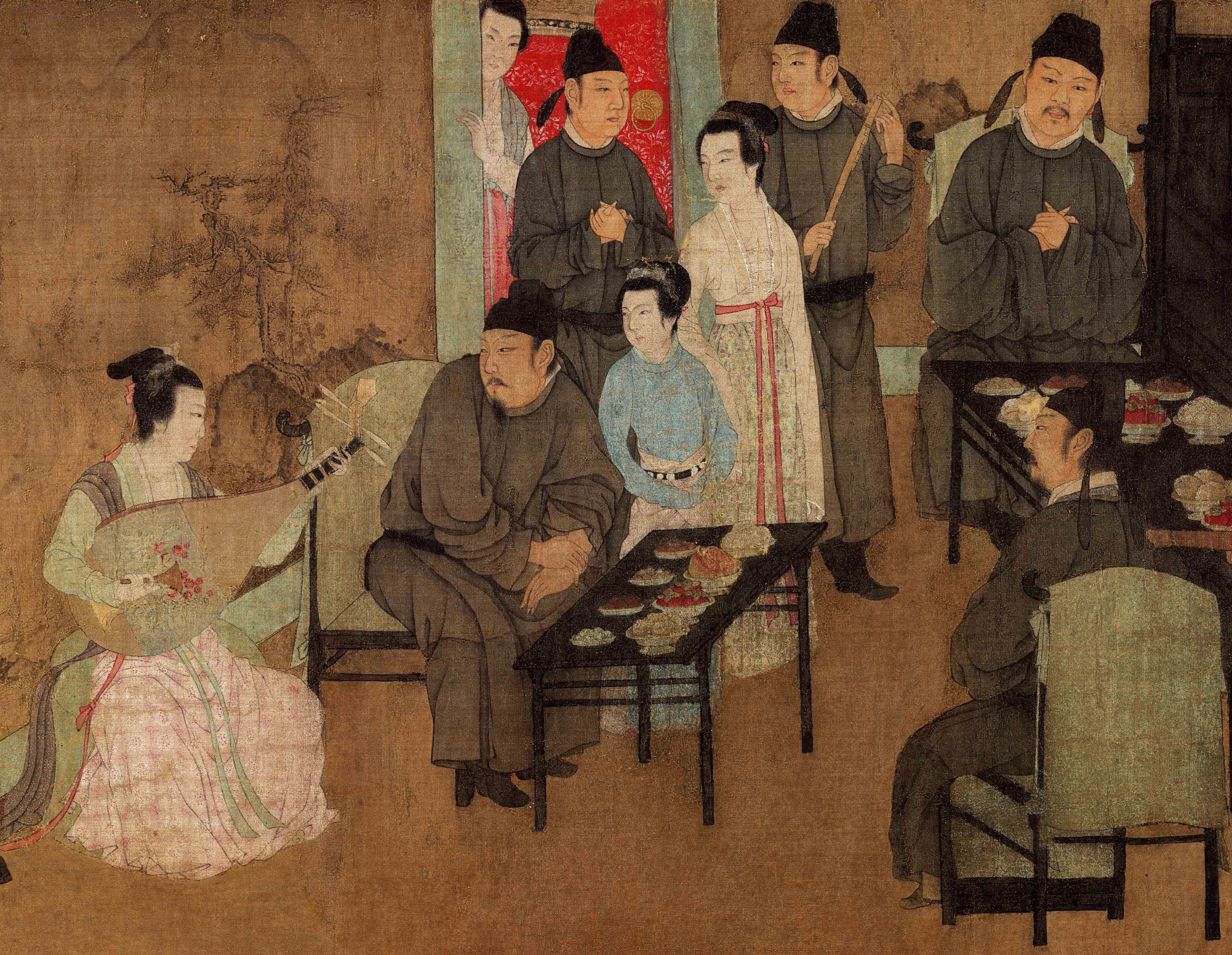
Song dynasty men wearing futou, as seen on 12th century remake of Night Revels of Han Xizai by Gu Hongzhong

The futou was popular in the Song dynasty, and it was commonly worn by all classes of people ranging from commoners to emperors. During the Song dynasty, the black muslin, which was mainly used to make the futou, was replaced by other materials, such as muslin or lacquered muslin. The futou could also be found with supports made out of wood, and therefore they could look like hats and caps of various styles. Hard ribbons were also used; and all the futou in this period had hard feet. There were 5 main types of futou in this period: the zhijiaofutou (also called píngjiǎofútóu (平腳幞頭; 'flat-feet futou') which was worn by people of all social classes (including both the upper and lower classes); the "bent-feet" futou, the Jiāojiǎofútóu (交腳幞頭; 'cross-feet futou'), the "upward" futou, and the "downwind" futou.

According to the Song Shi, the zhijiaofutou became the national standard form of futou in the Song dynasty for the emperor and the officials on any occasion, except when they had to take a carriage. The futou worn by the Song dynasty officials had an extended reclined feet; it was developed by having two hard ribbons made out with iron wire or bamboo strips attached at the back of the futou. According to the Pedantic Remarks of the Confucians by Yu Yan, this form of futou might have been developed to prevent the officials from whispering to each other during court audience with the Emperor. On some special occasions (e.g. the imperial court banquets, or the longevity ceremonies held for the royal family), Song court officials would put flowers on their futou; this was referred as Flower pinning. The Song emperors would sometimes send fresh flowers or man-made flowers which were exclusive to the use of the imperial court to his courtier; this later become a form of etiquette in the Song dynasty court.It is also recorded in the Song Shi that the upward futou was used by people (including the Emperor and the officials) when they found themselves in narrow spaces, such as in a carriage.

According to the first volume of the History Narrated at Ease in the section The Etiquette by Wang Dechen (1036 –1116), in the early Song dynasty, a type futou, called front-folded scarf, was worn by some people. The front-folded scarf was folded and tied at the front region of the head was worn by some people. The back-folded scarf was a type futou which would be bent backward; it started to be worn after the Shaosheng period (i.e. after 1098 AD). Following the Shaosheng period, there were many changes in the styles of futou.

There were also other forms of futou, such as the colourful flower-shaped futou embedded with gold lines which were sold in market of Dongjing; the curved-feet futou or the flower-like futou with feet curved backwards were also worn by some warriors; the long feet futou was favoured by the musical instrument plays of the imperial music office; the lustreless futou, and the white crêpe futou which was worn during funerals.

Types of futou in the Song dynasty
| Types of futou | Description | Pictures |
|---|---|---|
| Zhanjiao Putou 展角幞頭; 'spread-horn head cover' | It consisted of a black hat with two wing-like flaps which extends outward. The thin flaps were stiff and straight, and could extend up to almost a meter each. | |

=== Liao dynasty ===
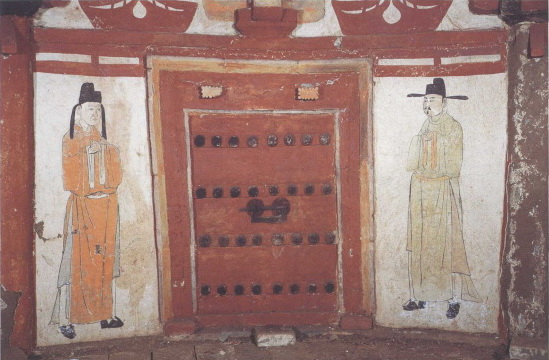
Men wearing futou, Liao dynasty, 982 AD

In the Khitan-led Liao dynasty, the Khitans shaved their hair in a style called kunfa and wore light hats made of felt or helmets which were more suitable for their horse riding activities instead of wearing the lacquered futou; however the futou did not disappear in this period and continued to be depicted in the Liao dynasty tomb murals, including the curved leg futou.

=== Yuan dynasty ===
In the Mongol-led Yuan dynasty, the futou continued to be worn since the Yuan dynasty court followed the Song dynasty standards regarding official costumes:

(All officials' work clothes should wear) straight tails painted hemp futou.

=== Ming dynasty / "Wushamao" (烏紗帽) ===
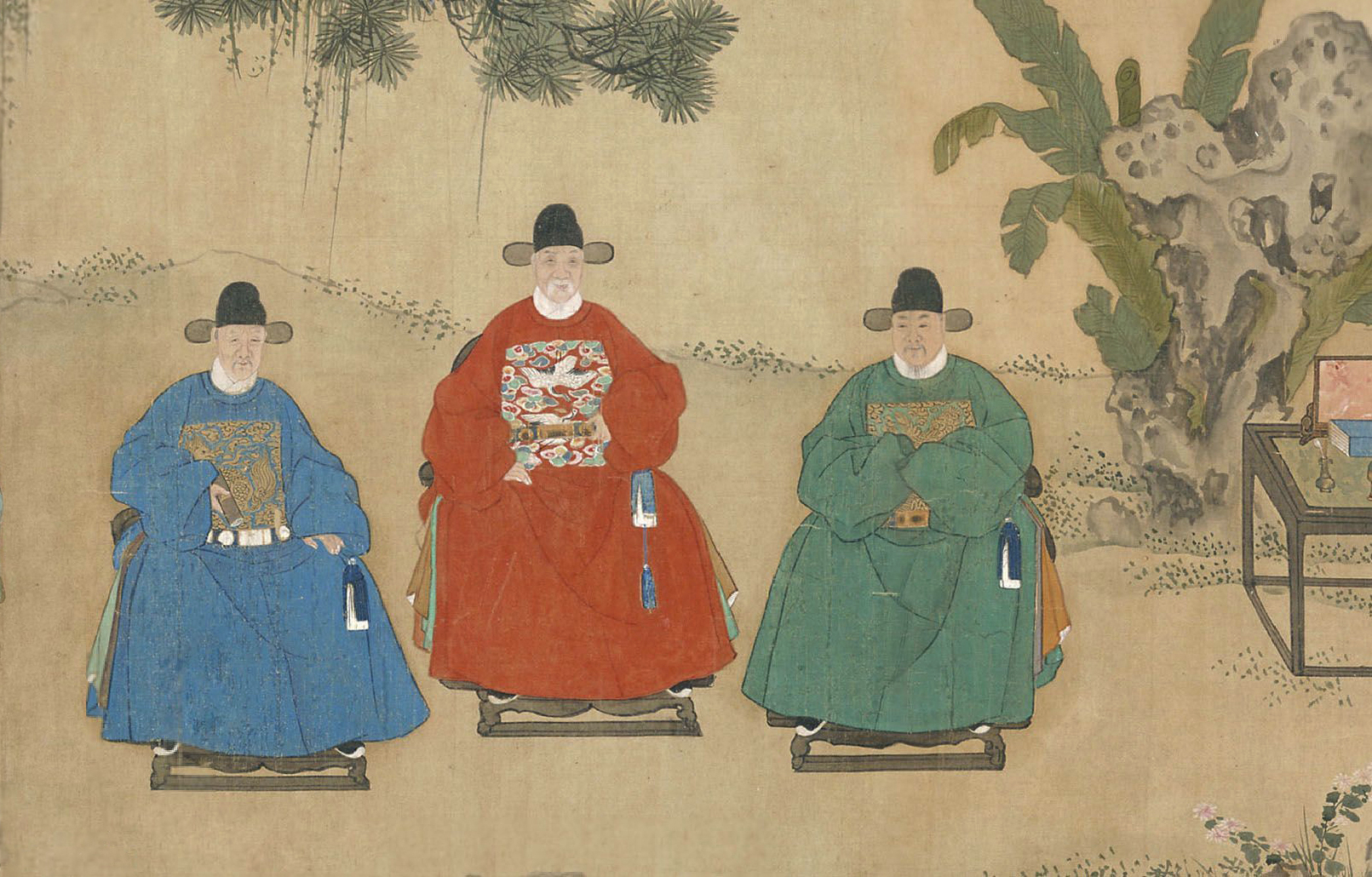
Ming dynasty officials wearing yuanlingshan and wushamao (a type of futou)

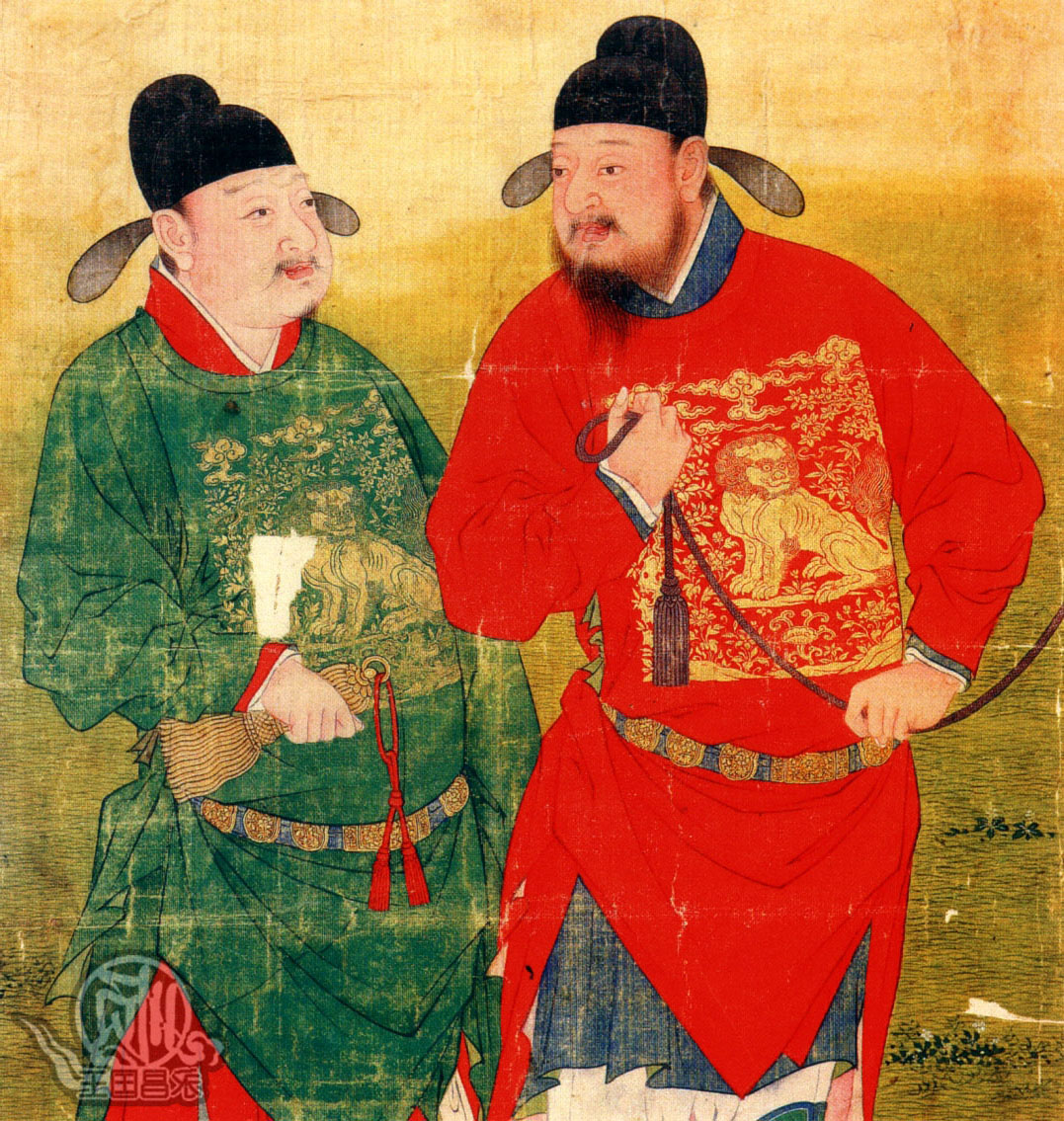
Early Ming Dynasty wushamao.

During the Ming dynasty, a type of futou was to be worn by government officials as part of the court uniform, called wushamao (乌纱帽). Wushamao resembled the futou used in the early Tang dynasty, but followed the crafting methods of the Song dynasty by using lacquered muslin and wooden or metal frames to cast its shape. The shape of the feet varies depending on the era, with some resembling the curved leaf appearance of the prior dynasties or the straight wing-like feet in the late Ming dynasty. The Ming dynasty also kept the tradition of using straight-feet futou; however, by the shape of the futou worn in the Ming dynasty diverted from that worn in the Song dynasty: the feet became shorter with time and some of these futou became less than forty centimetres. The forty centimetre long straight-feet, painted linen futou was worn by both the military and civil officials for official business according to the Ming Shi. The feet of the Ming dynasty straight-feet futou were not completely straight and had a curved tip which would bend upwards.

Types of Futou in the Ming dynasty
| Types of futou | Description | Pictures |
|---|---|---|
| Zhanchi Futou/putou (展翅襆頭), also known as the wushamao (烏紗帽; 'black gauze cap') | It is a headwear of Ming dynasty officials, consisting of a black hat with two wing-like flaps of thin, oval shaped boards on each side. According to the Collected Statutes of the Ming Dynasty (大明會典), ordinary citizens are not allowed to wear this headdress unless attending wedding ceremonies or events involving any noble families/officials. In modern China, wushamao is commonly used as a metaphor for officials and government posts. The Zhanchi Futou was also adopted by neighbouring countries. | |
| Zhanjiao Putou (展角幞頭; 'spread-horn head cover') | It was based on the Song dynasty's zhanjiao putou; in the Ming dynasty, it was worn by Ming civil officials at court assemblies when they would present memorials or retirement notices to the Ming rulers. | |
| Yishan guan (翼善冠; 'winged shan hat') | A type of futou made of lacquered silk which is formed on a wooden frame. At the back of the hat, there is a tall extension which is molded into 2 symmetrical bulbous shapes; there are 2 ribbons which are fastened to the hat's lower back and straight up extending just beyond the top protrusion. It is also a type of guan. | |

== Derivatives and influences ==
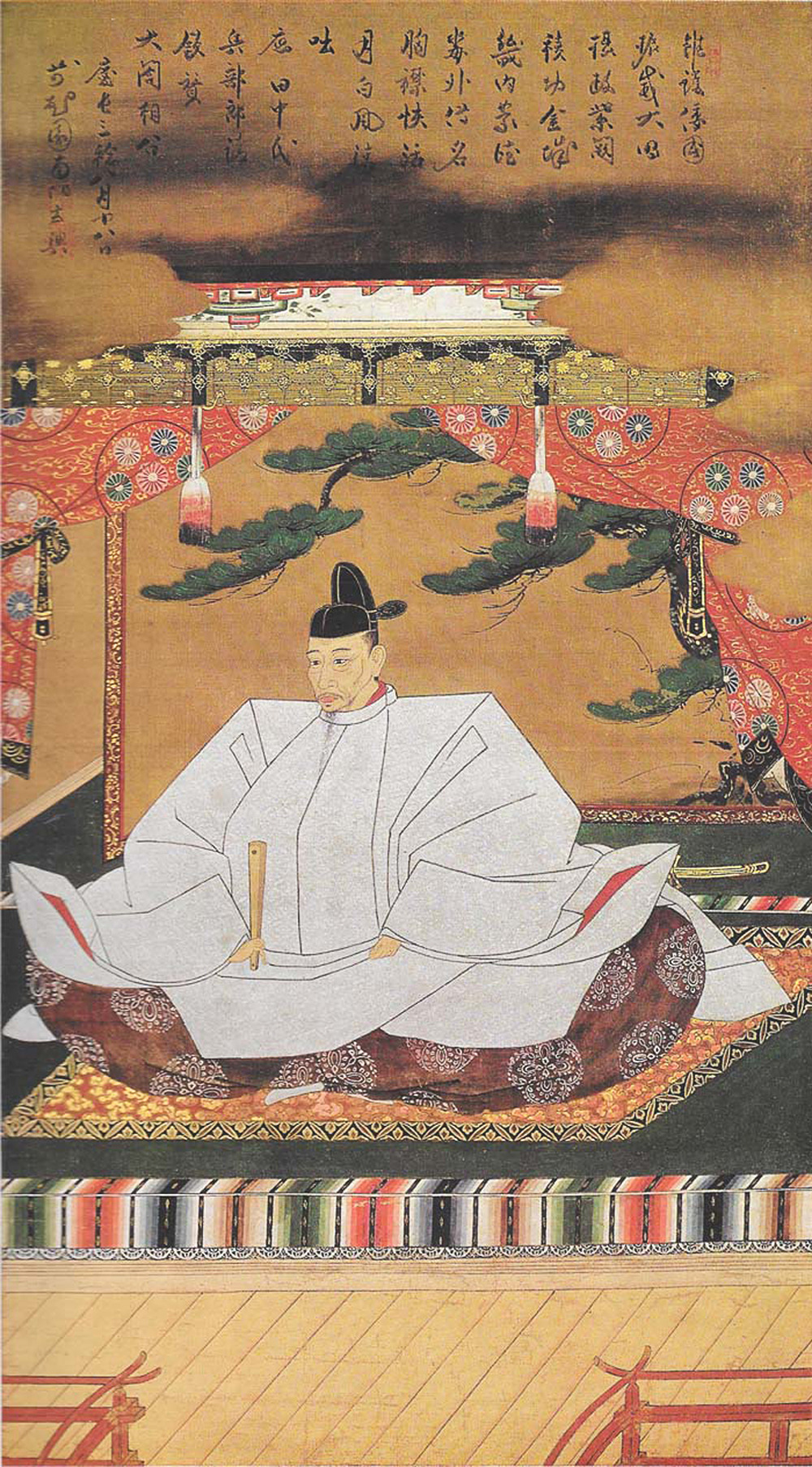
Japan's Toyotomi Hideyoshi wearing a hat influenced by wushamao (烏紗帽)

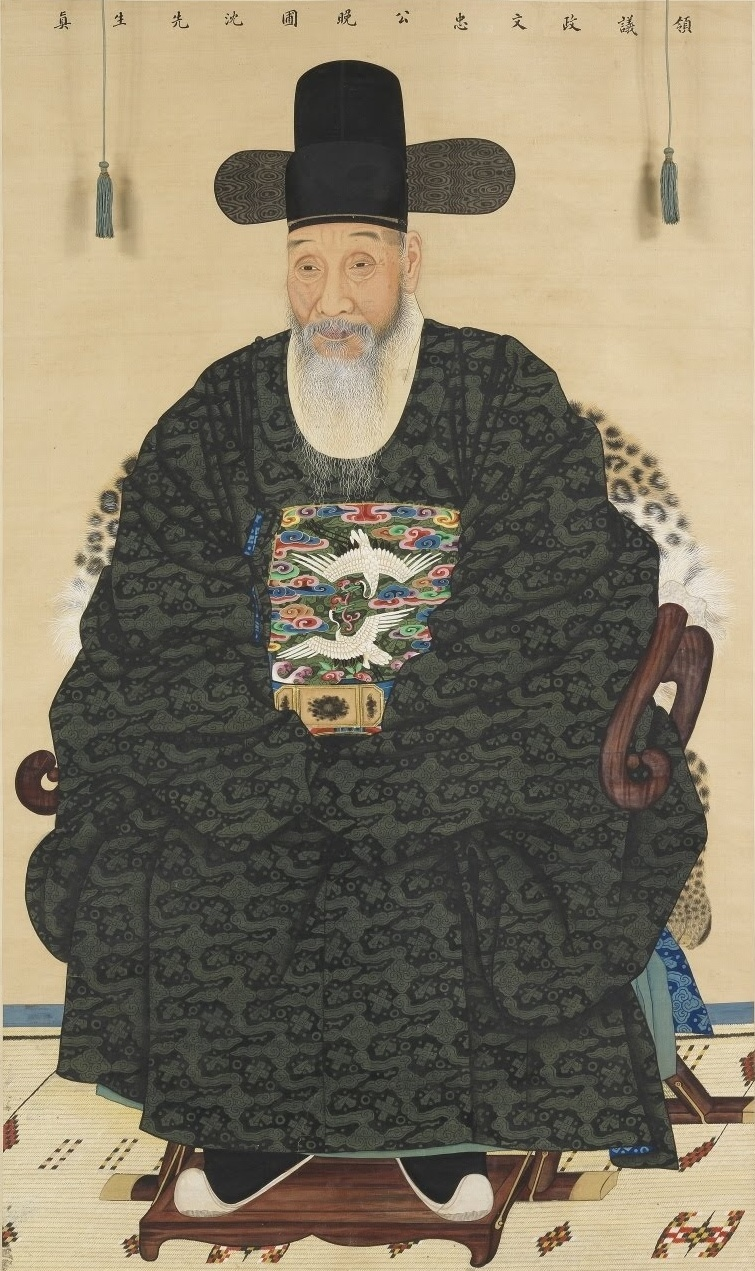
Joseon's Sim Hwan-ji wearing a hat influenced by osamo (烏紗帽)

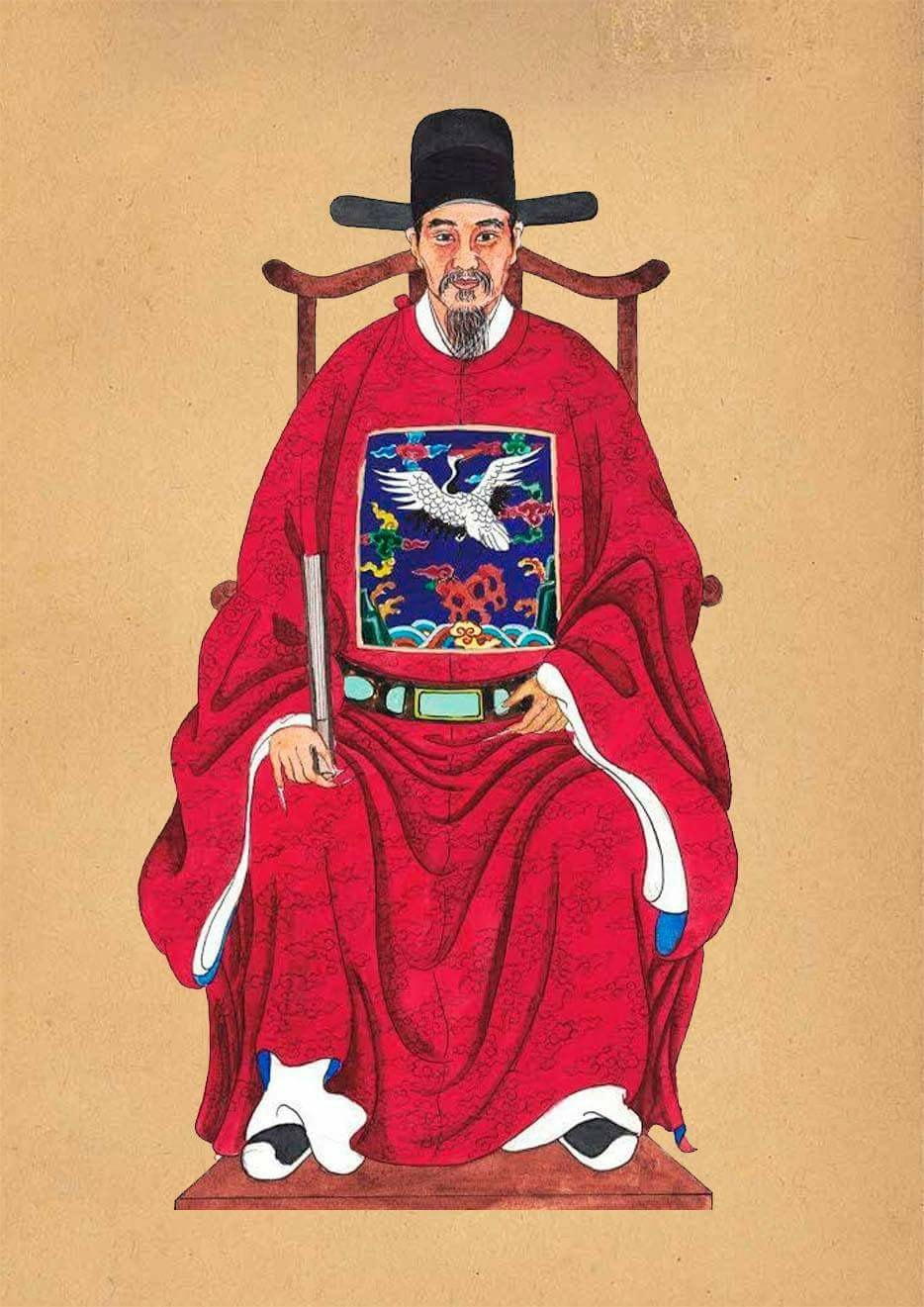
Vietnam's Trần Danh Án wearing an ô sa mạo hat (mũ cánh chuồn) influenced by wushamao

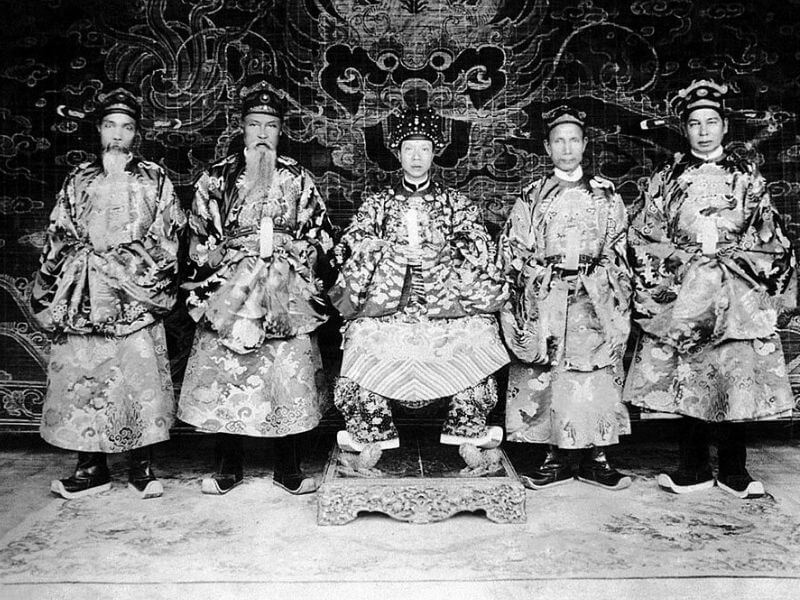
Emperor Khải Định (middle) and mandarins wearing ô sa mạo hats influenced by wushamao

== See also ==
- Hanfu
- Hanfu headgear
- List of hats and headgear
- Qing official headwear
