= Takhir Sabirov =

Tajikistani film director

- Born: Tahir Mukhtorovich Sabirov; 21 December 1929; Stalinabad, Tajik SSR, Soviet Union
- Died: 31 May 2002 (aged 72); Dushanbe, Tajikistan
- Occupations: Actor, film director, screenwriter, producer
- Years active: 1955–1991

Takhir Sabirov (Russian: Тахи́р Мухта́рович Саби́ров; 21 December 1929 – 31 May 2002) was a Soviet and Tajik film actor, director and screenwriter. He is known as the "founding father" of the One Thousand and One Nights dynasty of the film industry due to his creation of the Scheherazade trilogy.

He is also known by his formal name Takhir Mukhtorovich Sabirov. His mother Mastona Sobir Zoda was the daughter of Duke Sobir-kaloni Tura-zoda of Samarkand (now part of the Samarqand Province, Uzbekistan), from the Duchy of Greater Khorasan, known as Tura-zoda, who were eminent members of Central Asia's aristocracy. Takhir was the youngest of five children. He was married twice and has two sons and three daughters.

He completed the Performing Arts discipline at the Tashkent State Art Institute of Theatrical Arts in Tashkent, Uzbekistan. In 1951, he then continued further by obtaining his Directorial discipline under faculty of Yuri Zavadsky at the Russian Institute of Theatre Arts (GITIS) in Moscow.

His first film, The Road (1955), initiated him into the film industry, but the role of Yodgor in "Dokhunda" (1956) sparked his career and was followed by several successful roles. His directorial debut was in "Vaqti zangirii pisar rasid" (Russian title: "Sinu para jinitsa", 1959), which was the first comedy musical motion picture in the cinema of Tajikistan. With his films he introduced the Tajik film industry onto international scenebasis with his nomination in International film festivals. His film "Margi Sudkhur" (Russian title: "Smert' Rostovshika", 1966) was nominated at the International Film Festival of Asia and Africa in 1968.

His trilogy of "New Tales of Scheherazade", "Another Night of Scheherazade" and The Last Night of Scheherazade was based on the Arabic folktale One Thousand and One Nights had made a great impact in the cinema of Tajikistan by opening it to European audiences and borders. The Scheherazade trilogies were among the first Tajik film productions that achieved distribution beyond Russian borders, placing Tajik film on the map of International Film Festivals. Not only has he directed and co-written the Scheherazade trilogies, but also starred as King Shahryar (Sultan); which coincidentally is more true to his own lineage of royalty. He became a cultural icon gaining more acknowledgement and respect.

Regardless of the obstacles he had faced in his lifetime, he never stopped filming. He is known in the Tajik film industry as one of the major film directors of his time. He broadened his entertainment field as he established entrepreneurial joint venture "Movarounnahr Joint Venture" as an Art Director. Although he was involved in many fields of the film industry, he always had time to instruct and inspire students and apprentices.

In 1999, he was part of the judging committee in the 21st (XXI) Moscow International Film Festival. He became the first Tajik film director to be honored with the position of a film judge. In 2002, he was an honorary guest at the 55th (LV) Cannes Film Festival.

He died in Dushanbe at the age of 72.

== Awards and honors ==
- Medal "For Distinguished Labour" (1957)
- People's Artist of the Tajik SSR (1966)
- Order of the Badge of Honour (1971)
- Order of the Red Banner of Labour (1991)
- Order of Glory (Tajikistan) (1999)

== Filmography ==
- The Road (1955)
- A Unique Spring (1957)
- The Last Night of Scheherazade (1987)

== See also ==
- Cinema of Russia
- Cinema of Iran
- Tajikistan
