= Mairam Yusupova =

Tajikistani film director (born 1949)

- Born: 1949 (age 76–77)
- Occupation: Director

Mairam Yusupova (born 1949) is a Tajikistani film director.

== Life ==
Born in Dushanbe, Yusupova graduated from the directing department of VGIK in 1976. She first worked as a director of documentary films, making over 30 for Tajikfilm between 1978 and 1991. Many depict aspects of traditional Tajik life and culture, but some are on contemporary social topics. Stylistically, they tend to use little dialogue. During the Tajikistani Civil War she went to Moscow, but remained active in making films; in 1991 she released The Time of the Yellow Grass, describing the discovery of a young man's corpse by the inhabitants of a mountain community, and which blends documentary realism and fictional elements in its style. Its style has been called "metaphorical realism", and it has been described as "ironic". Yusupova has also worked in television during her career. In 1998 her documentary The Business Trip received a prize from the Eurasia Film Festival. Her films have been discussed as a part of the "Tajik New Wave" of cinema; stylistically, one writer has said that they are "not directly interventionist". As of 2001 she was still living in Moscow.
