= Portrait of Namjar =

The Portrait of Namjar (Chinese: 原逆將軍納穆扎爾像) has been part of the Faces to Remember: Chinese Portraits of the Ming and Qing dynasties (1368–1911) collection of the Royal Ontario Museum (ROM) in Canada. It is located on Level 1 of the ROM's Philosopher's Walk building in the Levy Gallery. The silk, ink and colour painting is 92.5 cm long and 84.4 cm wide. The painters are unknown.

== About ==
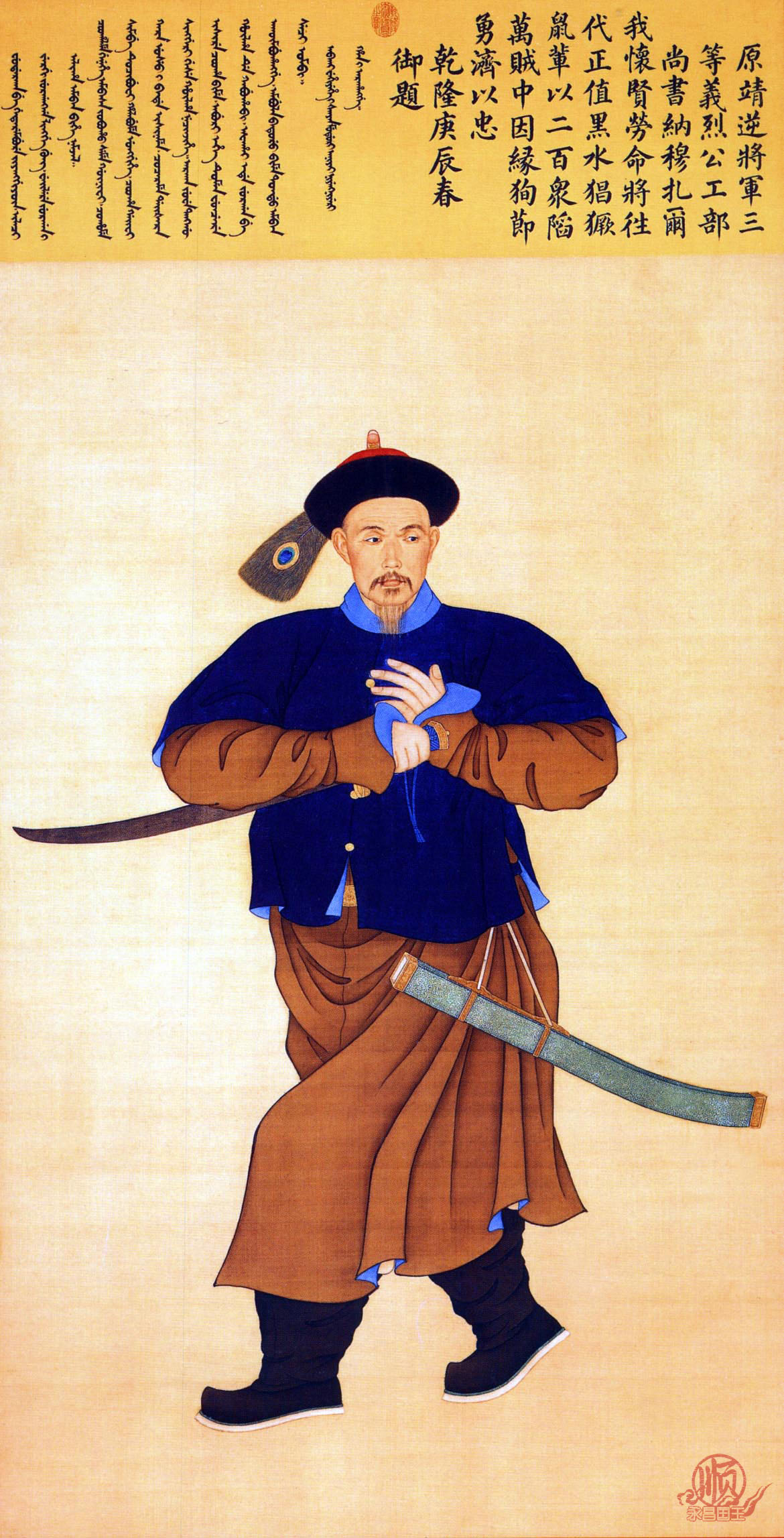
Namjar

Namjar was a Military Governor in charge of the Reconciliation of Rebels; Duke of the Third Rank; and President of the Board of Works. According to the scroll, he gave his life for his country and was a brave and loyal man. Namjar was of Mongol descent and belonged to the Plain White Banner. Namjar started his military service as a banner man and later rose in the ranks becoming a subaltern of the Guards designated by the wearing a blue feather. He continued his military career and eventually became a Military Governor. He died during the Dzungars and Pacification of Xinjiang (1755–1759) . In 1759, the Qianlong Emperor ordered his court painters to paint 100 of his best warriors and statesman in tribute their military successes during two campaigns on China's northwestern frontier. The posthumously done Portrait of Namjar was the 4th painting completed. It bears a eulogy in both the Chinese and Manchu languages, composed by the emperor. It reads:

Namjar, formerly Military Governor in Charge of the Pacification of Rebels;
Duke of the Third Rank with the Designation Yilie [Righteous and Ardent];
and President of the Board of Works
Much worried about the hardship of my worthy [officials],
I dispatched a replacement.
It was during the Black River [siege].
That rats ran wild.
[Leading only] two hundred soldiers,
[Namjar and his cavalry] were ensnared by thousands of rebels.
He gave his life for his country,
This brave and loyal man.

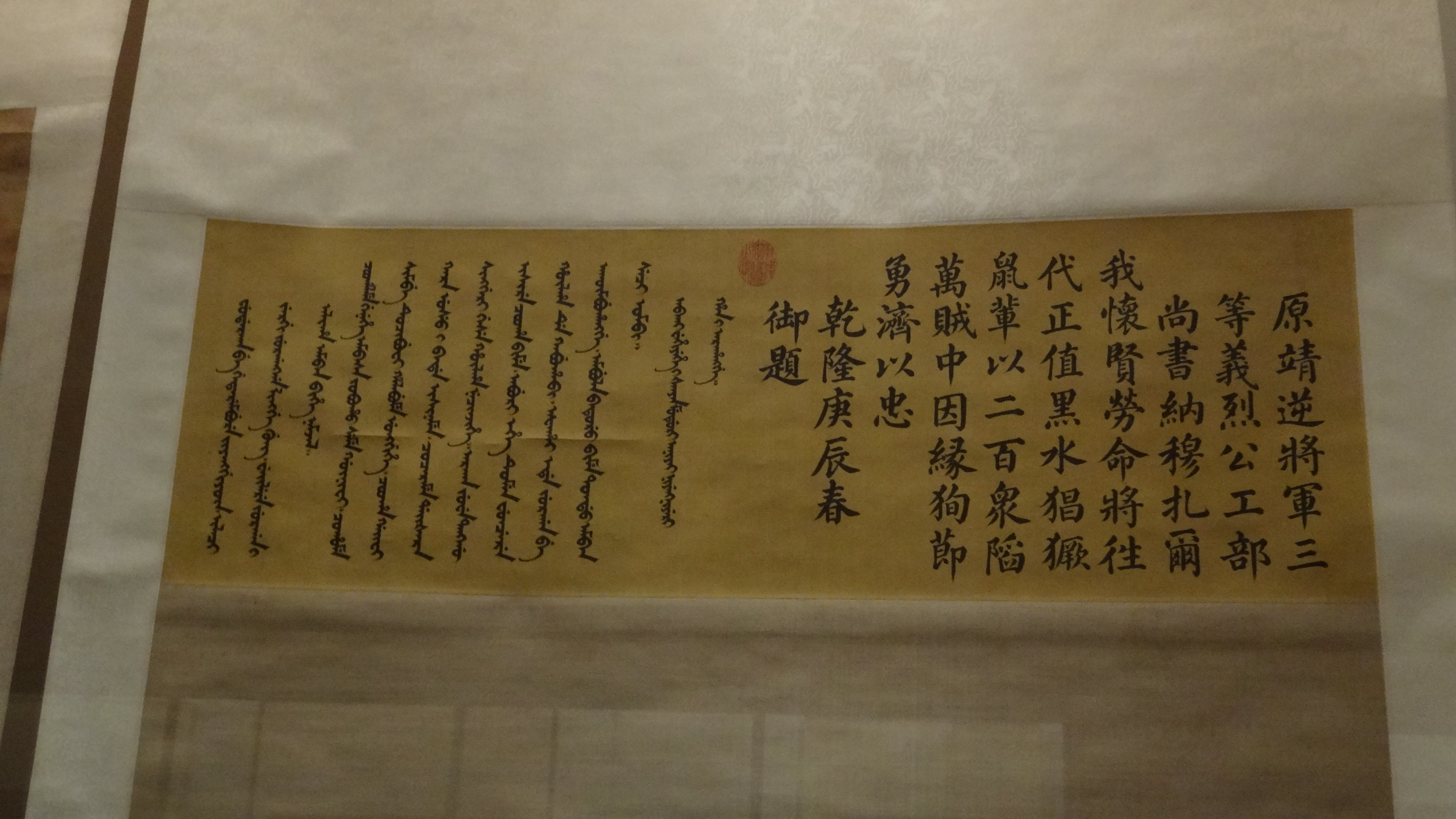
Eulogy to Namjar

== Description ==
Namjar is depicted wearing a blue riding jacket over a light brown robe, a winter hat topped with a red finial and a single-eyed peacock feather, and a pair of black satin boots. He is facing the viewer while walking right to left, and is looking to his left in an uncomfortable pose, holding his sword. His eyebrows are raised and his forehead furrowed. The artist is unknown. The hanging scroll is made out of silk. And the top and the bottom is made out of ivory. The roll was painted during Qing Dynasty.

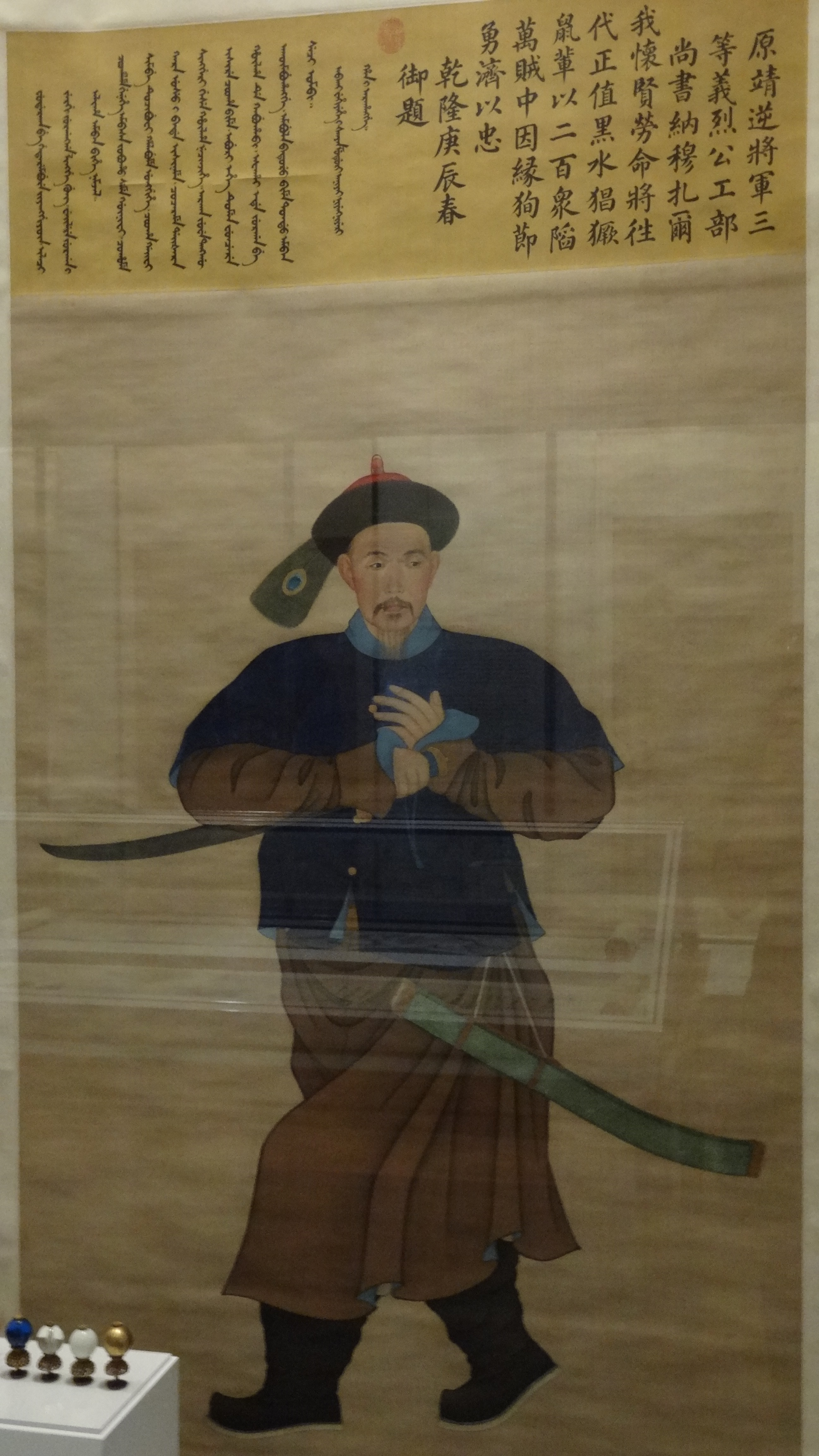
Portrait of Namjar, Southeast Asia Gallery, Royal Ontario Museum
