= The Last Night of Scheherazade =

- Directed by: Takhir Sabirov
- Written by: Takhir Sabirov; Valery Karen
- Starring: Yelena Tonunz; Tachir Sabirov; Ulugbek Musaffarov
- Cinematography: Rustam Mukhamedzhanov
- Music by: Gennadiy Aleksandrov
- Production company: Tajikfilm
- Release date: 1987
- Running time: 84 minutes
- Countries: Soviet Union; Syria
- Language: Russian

The Last Night of Scheherazade (Russian: Последняя ночь Шахерезады, romanized: Poslednaya noch Shakherezady) is a 1987 Soviet-Syrian children's fantasy film directed by Takhir Sabirov based on One Thousand and One Nights. It is the last film of the trilogy (and the last film produced by its production company, Tajikfilm), following the films New Tales of Scheherazade and And another night of Scheherazade.

The heroes of the film are the shoemaker Maruf and the daughter of the Caliph, Esmagül, who despite falling in love with a young man, nevertheless forces him to fight for his own happiness.

== Plot ==
Full of impatience, the Caliph is eager to learn from Scheherezade what happened when cobbler Maruf returned to the city of the Caliph with the heavily laden caravan. After his arrival, Maruf pays his debts to the merchants and his wedding with Princess Esmagül gets under way. However, the vizier Dschaffar finds out that Maruf is just a shoemaker, who owes his wealth to the jinn of the magic ring. Secretly he robs Maruf of the precious gem, with which he immediately rises to the rank of a caliph. He lets his predecessor and Maruf disappear into the desert.

When the two ex-hunters then meet a dragon in the arid wasteland, Scheherezade tells the new caliph that she can not tell the story as long as he carries the magic ring on his finger. Desiring to learn the further events, Jaffar puts it aside, whereupon Scheherezade tells him that Princess Esmagül who is standing behind him, is to take possession of the miracle ring. Those threatened by the dragon immediately wish themselves back and Jaffar is turned into a vile lizard to be thrown to the animals. Unwanted by Esmagül, the ring later returns to the possession of Maruf, who then flies with the princess on the back of the giant jinn to his homeland. On the way Esmagül is kidnapped by Tiuli-Kos. However, the jinn, exhausted by the many wishes, can not bring her back, so he deposes Maruf with his last strength near the kidnapper's town. Alone, the shoemaker arrives there, with the intention of liberating his princess.

With the help of the liberated Saeed, who was captured for seeking his lover, also stolen for the harp of the ancient Tiuli-Kos, Maruf disguises himself as a famous physician and thus gains access to the palace of Tiuli-Kos. He lets Esmagül take a soporific herbal drink, bringing the lifeless beauty, who has been found dead, into the desert. After Esmagül was awakened from her sleep by Maruf, the recovering jinn flies the two lovers to the shoemaker's hometown, where they spend their lives in joy and happiness. The slaves of the harem are also cheerful and happy, because the jinn helps bring them back to their freedom at their request.

== Cast ==
- Scheherazade — Yelena Tonunz
- The Caliph Schachrijar — Takhir Sabirov
- Cobbler Maruf — Ulugbek Musaffarov
- Princess Esmagül — Tamara Jandieva
- Amal' — Gada Alschama
- Tiuli-Kos — Abdussalam Al-Taib
- Tiuli-Kos' Executioner Masrur — Maschar Alchakim
- Ghost — Gennady Tschetwerikov
- Hassan — Chaisam Balani
- The vizier Jaffar — Ivan Gavriljuk
- Saeed — A. Massud
