= The First Echelon =

1955 Soviet film

- Directed by: Mikhail Kalatozov
- Written by: Nikolai Pogodin
- Starring: Vsevolod Sanayev; Nikolay Annenkov; Oleg Yefremov; Izolda Izvitskaya
- Cinematography: Sergey Urusevsky; Yuri Ekelchik
- Edited by: Zoya Verevkina
- Music by: Dmitri Shostakovich
- Production company: Mosfilm
- Release date: 1955
- Running time: 114 minutes
- Country: Soviet Union
- Language: Russian

The First Echelon (Russian: Первый эшелон, translit. Pervyy eshelon) is a 1955 Soviet war romance film directed by Mikhail Kalatozov, for which Dmitri Shostakovich wrote the music. The film tells the story of the touching romance between Komsomol secretary Alexey Uzorov and tractor driver Anna Zalogina against the background of Virgin Lands Campaign in Kazakhstan. Part of Shostakovich's score was used as the basis for the Suite for Variety Orchestra No. 1. "Waltz II" from the suite was used in the 1999 Stanley Kubrick film Eyes Wide Shut.

== Cast ==
- Vsevolod Sanayev as Alexey Yegorovich Dontsov, state farm director
- Nikolay Annenkov as Kashtanov, secretary of the RC
- Oleg Yefremov as Alexey Uzorov
- Izolda Izvitskaya as Anna Zalogina
- Nina Doroshina as Nelly Panina
- Vyacheslav Voronin as Troyan
- Khoren Abrahamyan as Varten Vartanyan
- Tatiana Doronina as Zoya
