= Tajikfilm =

Film studio in Tajikistan

Jan Films
- Type: Corporation
- Industry: Motion pictures Animated films
- Founded: 1930
- Headquarters: Dushanbe, Tajikistan
- Products: Motion pictures Television programs

Tajikfilm (Tajik: Тоҷикфилм, Russian: Таджикфильм) is a Tajik (formerly Soviet) film studio. Tajikfilm was founded in 1930 as a newsreel studio; the studio released its first feature film in 1932 and its first talkie in 1935. In 1941, Tajikfilm merged with Soyuzdetfilm, only to reemerge in 1943. The studio produced films in both Russian and Tajik. It is one of the oldest film studios in Tajikistan.

The studio is based in Dushanbe, Tajikistan.

Since 1993, not a single film has been shot at the film studio due to lack of funding. The film studio staff survived on small international orders for video films and videos. In 2005, "Tajikfilm" began filming a large-scale epic "Shamsiddin Shohin" - about the life of a Tajik classic.

== Films ==
- Smert' rostovshchika (Смерть ростовщика) – 1966.
- Skazanie o Rustame (Сказание о Рустаме) – 1972.
- Rustam i Suhrab (Рустам и Сухрaб) – 1972.
- Zvezda v nochi (Звезда в ночи) – 1972.
- Tayna predkov (Тайна предков) – 1972.
- Skazanie o Siyavushe (Сказание о Сиявуше) – 1976.
- The Bodyguard – 1979.
- V talom snege zvon ruchya (В талом снеге звон ручья) – 1983.
- Semeinye tainy (Семейные тайны) – 1985.
- Govoryaschii rodnik (Говорящий родник) – 1986.
- The Last Night of Scheherazade — 1987

== See also ==
- Cinema of Tajikistan
