= Tang official headwear =

Chinese headwear with drooping flats at the sides

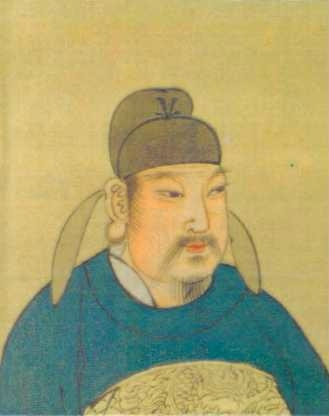
Tang Emperor Xuanzong wearing Tang official headwear

The Tang official headwear or Chuijiao Putou (垂腳襆頭), lit. "head cover" or "head wrap", was the headwear of Tang dynasty officials. It consisted of a black hat with two wing-like flaps. However, contrary to the similar Song official headwear in the Song dynasty, the flaps drooped down.

== See also ==
- Song official headwear
- Qing official headwear
- Futou
- List of hats and headgear
- Hanfu
