= Guzel Maitdinova =

Geopolitician based in Tajikistan

Dr. Guzel Maitdinova (Maytdinova) (born 5 September 1952) is a Eurasian geopolitician, ethnologist, historian and archeologist based in Tajikistan. She is a professor at the Department of History and Theory of International Relations of Russian-Tajik (Slavic) University (RTSU), a Director of the Center of Geopolitical Studies of Russian-Tajik (Slavic) University, and an executive director of the Central Asian Expert Club 'Eurasian Development' in Dushanbe.

== Education ==
Guzel Maitdinova was born in Kashgar (People's Republic of China). She graduated in history from the State Samarkand University of Alisher Navoi (Samarkand, Republic of Uzbekistan) in 1977. From 1987 to 2015 – a Leading Researcher of the Department of Art history of Institute of History, Archeology and Ethnography of Akhmad Donish, Academy of Sciences of Republic of Tajikistan in Dushanbe, Tajikistan. She received her PhD in Art Studies from the Institute of Art Studies in Tashkent, Uzbekistan in 1992, and the Doctorship degree in history from the Institute of History, Archeology and Ethnography of Akhmad Donish, Academy of Sciences of Republic of Tajikistan in 1997.

== Career and research ==
Since 1997 she is a professor of the Department of History and Theory of International Relations of Russian-Tajik (Slavic) University (RTSU). She is a Director of the Center of Geopolitical Studies of Russian-Tajik (Slavic) University since 2003, and an executive director of the Central Asian Expert Club 'Eurasian Development' since 2014.

Guzel Maitdinova developed and teaches the following author's courses 'Geopolitics' and 'Geopolitics of Asian States' in Russian-Tajik (Slavic) University. She owns 15 Certificates of Authorship of the State Committee of Inventions of USSR and 2 Patents of inventions of Republic of Tajikistan (1998). Maitdinova served as a consultant for the cycle of documentaries on the Ancient civilizations of Central Asia directed by her spouse Tajik filmmaker Mamatkul Arabov.

She is an author of more than 160 research works.

== Selected works ==
=== Monographs ===
- 2015 – The Dialogue of Civilizations in the Central Asian area of the Great Silk Route: Historical experience of integration and reference points of XXI century
- 2011 – The Kirpand State – an Empire in Middle Asia
- 2009 – Economic interests of Russia in Tajikistan: risks and possibilities. (cowritten with G.Koshlakov and M.Turaeva)
- 2004 – The History of Tajik Costume. The genesis of the costume of Tajiks: Antiquity and Early Middle Ages (Vol.1)
- 2004 – The History of Tajik Costume. Medieval and Traditional costume (Vol.2)
- 1996 – Early Medieval Textiles of Central Asia
- 1992 – The costume of Early Medieval Tocharistan: History and Links

== Sources ==
- Guzel Maitdinova on the Official web page of the Central Asian Expert Club 'Eurasian Development'
- Guzel Maitdinova on the Author's Project 'Central Asia' by Vladimir Paramonov
