= The Poet (1956 film) =

1956 film by Boris Barnet

- Russian: Поэт
- Directed by: Boris Barnet
- Written by: Valentin Kataev
- Starring: Nikolay Kryuchkov; Izolda Izvitskaya; Sergey Dvoretskiy; Zoya Fyodorova; I. Kolin; Olga Vikland
- Production company: Mosfilm
- Release date: 1956
- Running time: 96 minutes
- Country: Soviet Union
- Language: Russian

The Poet (Russian: Поэт) is a 1956 Soviet drama film directed by Boris Barnet.

== Plot ==
In a port city during the Russian Civil War, poetry evenings are held where two local lyric poets—Tarasov (Sergei Dvoretsky) and Orlovsky (Vsevolod Larionov)—captivate audiences with their work. As the conflict deepens, their paths diverge: Orlovsky joins the White movement, while Tarasov sides with the Reds.

== Cast ==
- Nikolay Kryuchkov as Nikolai Tzarev, communist leader
- Izolda Izvitskaya as Olga, communist agent
- Sergey Dvoretskiy as Nikolai Tarasov, communist poet (as S. Dvoretskiy)
- Zoya Fyodorova as Katherine Tarasova, mother of Nikolai (as Z. Fyodorova)
- I. Kolin as Pharmacist
- Olga Vikland as Pharmacist's wife
- Pyotr Aleynikov as Stepan - Red Army soldier
- Vsevolod Larionov as Sergei Orlovsky - anti-communist
- Georgiy Georgiu as Father Orlovsky
- Ivan Koval-Samborsky as Colonel
- Vera Altayskaya as Secretary
- Pyotr Berezov as Artist
- Valentin Gaft as French soldier
- Tatyana Guretskaya as Communist agent
- Rina Zelyonaya as Poet
