= The Forty-First (1956 film) =

1956 film by Grigori Chukhrai

- Directed by: Grigori Chukhrai
- Screenplay by: Grigori Koltunov
- Based on: The Forty-First by Boris Lavrenyov
- Produced by: G. Lukin
- Starring: Izolda Izvitskaya; Oleg Strizhenov; Nikolai Kryuchkov
- Cinematography: Sergey Urusevsky
- Edited by: Lidia Lysenkova
- Music by: Nikolai Kryukov
- Production company: Mosfilm
- Release date: 15 October 1956 (USSR)
- Running time: 88 minutes
- Country: Soviet Union
- Language: Russian

The Forty-First (Russian: Сорок первый, romanized: Sorok pervyy) is a 1956 Soviet war romance film based on the eponymous novel by Boris Lavrenyov. It was directed by Grigori Chukhrai, who also wrote the screenplay, and starred Izolda Izvitskaya and Oleg Strizhenov. The film, a remake of the 1927 movie with the same name, is set during the Russian Civil War and tells the story of a tragic romance between a female sniper of the Red Army and an officer of the White Army.

== Plot ==
In 1919, during the Russian Civil War, a small force of Red Army soldiers that survived a crushing defeat by the Whites is forced to flee into the Karakum Desert. Among them is female sniper Maria, who has already claimed thirty-eight enemies dead. When the unit ambushes a camel caravan transporting White soldiers, she kills two of them and tries to shoot their officer, who will be her forty-first, but misses. The man, a lieutenant named Govorukha-Otrok, is carrying a letter from Admiral Aleksandr Kolchak to General Anton Denikin that states he has secret information to be conveyed orally to General Dratsekno. Maria is entrusted with guarding him. Tensions arise between the two: the officer is a well-educated aristocrat who is both amused and impressed by the crude attempts of Maria, a fisherman's orphan daughter, to compose Agitprop poetry. When their camels are stolen, their commander decides to send his captive on a boat to their headquarters in Kazalinsk via the Aral Sea. The vessel capsizes in a sudden storm, and only Maria and Otrok remain alive, stranded on an isolated island. The Red soldier treats the White officer when he catches a fever and is slowly charmed by his manners, while he is overcome with gratitude and begins to call her 'Man Friday' with affection. When she demands to know what he means, he tells her the story about Robinson Crusoe. The two fall in love and seem to forget about the war.

When a boat approaches their isle, they first think these are fishermen and run toward them. Otrok recognizes them as White soldiers, intends to join them, and encourages Maria to come with him, promising her she will be safe. Instead, Maria shoots him in the back, killing him.

== Cast ==
- Izolda Izvitskaya as Maria 'Maryutka' Filatovna Basova
- Oleg Strizhenov as Lieutenant Vadim Nikolaevich Govorukha-Otrok
- Nikolai Kryuchkov as Commissar Arsentiy Yevsyukov
- Assanbek Umuraliyev as Umankul
- Nikolay Dupak as Chupilko
- Pyotr Lyubeshkin as Guzhov
- Georgi Shapovalov as Terentyev
- Danil Netrebin as Semyanin
- Anatoli Kokorin as Yegorov
- Muratbek Ryskulov as caravan master
- T. Sardarbekova as Aul girl
- Kirey Zharkimbayev as Timerkul, Aul elder
- Vadim Zakharchenko as Lieutenant Kuchkovskiy
- S. Solonitsky as White colonel
- Alexander Grechany as Prokopych
- Nikolai Khryashchikov as the Yesaul

== Background and production ==
The film was based on the story of the same name by Boris Lavrenyov, which had already been filmed as a silent film by Yakov Protazanov in 1927. In a 1956 letter to the literary historian Boris Geronimus, Lavrenyov wrote: "I never needed any documentary sources for writing The Wind [Veter, 1924] and The Forty-First. All the things that came into these two novellas were based on my own experiences and are about the real people I came to know personally. The character of Maryutka [Maria Filatovna Basova] had been taken by me wholesale from Anya Vlasova, the real girl, who'd volunteered for the Red Army and served at the Turk[estan] Front. Later she often visited the offices of Krasnaya Zvezda with her extremely touching, but totally ridiculous poems, one of which I quoted in the novella, without making any change. And Govorukha-Otrok was a real-life poruchik, who'd been captured by one of our cavalry units in Priaralye. So what I did was arrange for these two real people a fictitious meeting and thus came up with their robinzonada on the isle of Barsa-Kelmes."

The film was Grigori Chukhrai's directorial debut. The Mosfilm directorate was reluctant to authorize Koltunov's script, as the portrayal of a love story between Red and White soldiers was deemed inappropriate: the script had to be revised six times. However, Chukhrai had the support of the eminent directors Ivan Pyryev and Mikhail Romm. When the screenplay was discussed in the directorate on 19 April 1955 and several of those present raised the issue, Romm said: "very well! Let every girl fall in love with the enemy and then kill him [in deference to her patriotism]." As this form of ending was considered to be a prime example of socialist realism, it was approved for filming.

Principal photography commenced in spring 1956 and ended in the summer. It was conducted in the Turkmen SSR, in the vicinity of Krasnovodsk and on the Caspian Sea's Cheleken Peninsula; the latter served as the location for the island scenes.

== Reception ==
The Forty-First attracted 25.1 million viewers in the Soviet Union, becoming the tenth most successful picture at the 1956 box office. At the Mosfilm Festival of Young Filmmakers held between 12 and 15 April that year, the film won in the categories for Best Film, Best Actor and Best Cinematography. At the 1957 Edinburgh International Film Festival it won an Honorary Diploma. At the 1957 Cannes Film Festival, it also won the Special Jury Prize and was nominated for the Palme d'Or.

== See also ==
- The Forty-First (1927 film)
