= Fathers and Sons (1959 film) =

- Russian: Отцы и дети
- Directed by: Adolf Bergunker; Natalya Rashevskaya
- Written by: Natalya Rashevskaya; Aleksandr Vitenzon; Ivan Turgenev (novel)
- Starring: Viktor Avdyushko; Eduard Martsevich; Aleksey Konsovsky; Bruno Freindlich; Izolda Izvitskaya
- Cinematography: Anatoli Nazarov
- Edited by: Yevgenia Makhankova
- Music by: Venedikt Pushkov
- Production company: Lenfilm
- Release date: 1959
- Running time: 103 min.
- Country: Soviet Union
- Language: Russian

Fathers and Sons (Russian: Отцы и дети, romanized: Ottsy i deti) is a 1959 Soviet historical drama film directed by Adolf Bergunker and Natalya Rashevskaya.

== Plot ==
The film tells about the inevitable conflict of two generations: the younger and older...

== Cast ==
- Viktor Avdyushko as Yevgeny Bazarov
- Eduard Martsevich as Arkady Kirsanov
- Aleksey Konsovsky as Nikolai Petrovich Kirsanov
- Bruno Freindlich as Pavel Petrovich Kirsanov
- Izolda Izvitskaya as Fenichka
- Alla Larionova as Anna Sergeyevna Odintsova
- Nikolai Sergeyev as Vasily Ivanovich Bazarov
- Yekaterina Aleksandrovskaya as Arina Vlasyevna
- Valentina Bulanova as Yekaterina "Katya" Sergeyevna Lokteva
- Georgy Vitsin as Sitnikov
- Nina Drobysheva as Nanny Dunyasha
- Lyudmila Makarova as Kukshina

== See also ==
- Fathers and Sons (novel)
