= A Unique Spring =

- Original Romanian film poster
- Directed by: Aleksandr Stolper
- Written by: Sergei Yermolinsky
- Starring: Yevgeniya Kozyreva; Izolda Izvitskaya; Aleksandr Mikhaylov
- Cinematography: Aleksandr Kharitonov
- Edited by: Mariya Timofeeva
- Music by: Nikolai Kryukov
- Production company: Mosfilm
- Release date: 31 May 1957
- Running time: 94 minutes
- Country: Soviet Union
- Language: Russian

A Unique Spring (Russian: Неповторимая весна, romanized: Nepovtorimaya vesna) is a 1957 Soviet drama film directed by Aleksandr Stolper and starring Yevgeniya Kozyreva, Izolda Izvitskaya and Aleksandr Mikhaylov.

The film shows a young archaeologist couple who have just married, who arrives in Central Asia for the excavations. The plague which has broken out separates them for some time and causes the girl's mother to seek help from her ex-husband.

== Plot ==
Anna and Yevgeny are deeply in love and decide to marry. Before the wedding, Anna has a long conversation with her mother, Elena Andreyevna, about her father, General Alexander Vasilyevich Novozhilov, whom she hasn't seen in years. On their wedding day, Anna learns more about her father, now a high-ranking general, and the couple visits him at his country house. Their meeting is interrupted by the general's second wife, Klavdia Nikolaevna, whose rude behavior drives Anna and Yevgeny to leave abruptly.

After the wedding, the newlywed archaeologists, the Burovs, travel to Central Asia for an excavation. Their expedition takes a dramatic turn when a plague outbreak occurs in a neighboring region, placing their worksite under quarantine. During the dig, Yevgeny discovers a valuable sixth-century coin but risks his life to save an infected driver. He contracts no symptoms but is placed in isolation. Despite the danger, Anna, worried for her husband, persuades a border guard to let her into the restricted zone. She arranges for a phone line to be installed in Yevgeny's room and continues participating in the excavation while awaiting his recovery.

Meanwhile, Anna's mother seeks help from her former husband, General Novozhilov, to ensure the safety of Anna and Yevgeny. The general uses his influence to connect with the quarantined area, where the danger subsides. The outbreak proves to be an isolated case, and Soviet doctors successfully contain the epidemic. The driver succumbs to the disease, but the quarantine is lifted, and the excavation ends triumphantly. In the meantime, Novozhilov decides to leave Klavdia after 16 years and seeks reconciliation with Elena. She cannot forgive his years of absence and declines his proposal to reunite, reminding him, “Spring does not repeat itself.” Anna and Yevgeny return home after their expedition, where Anna shares an emotional embrace with her mother, reaffirming their bond.

== Cast ==
- Yevgeniya Kozyreva as Elena
- Izolda Izvitskaya as Anna Burova
- Aleksandr Mikhaylov as Yevgeny Burov
- Ivan Dmitriev as Aleksandr Novozhilov
- Irina Skobtseva as Claudia Novozhilova
- Svetlana Kharitonova as Masha
- Nina Doroshina as Nina
- Viktor Sharlakhov as Gulyaev
- Leonid Parkhomenko as Brëkhov
- Takhir Sabirov as Sakhat
- Yevgeny Leonov as Alexey Koshelev
- Boris Bityukov as Officer PPC
- Daniil Netrebin as Kuzya

== Bibliography ==
- Rollberg, Peter. Historical Dictionary of Russian and Soviet Cinema. Scarecrow Press, 2008.
