= Zhanjiao Futou =

Medieval Chinese headwear

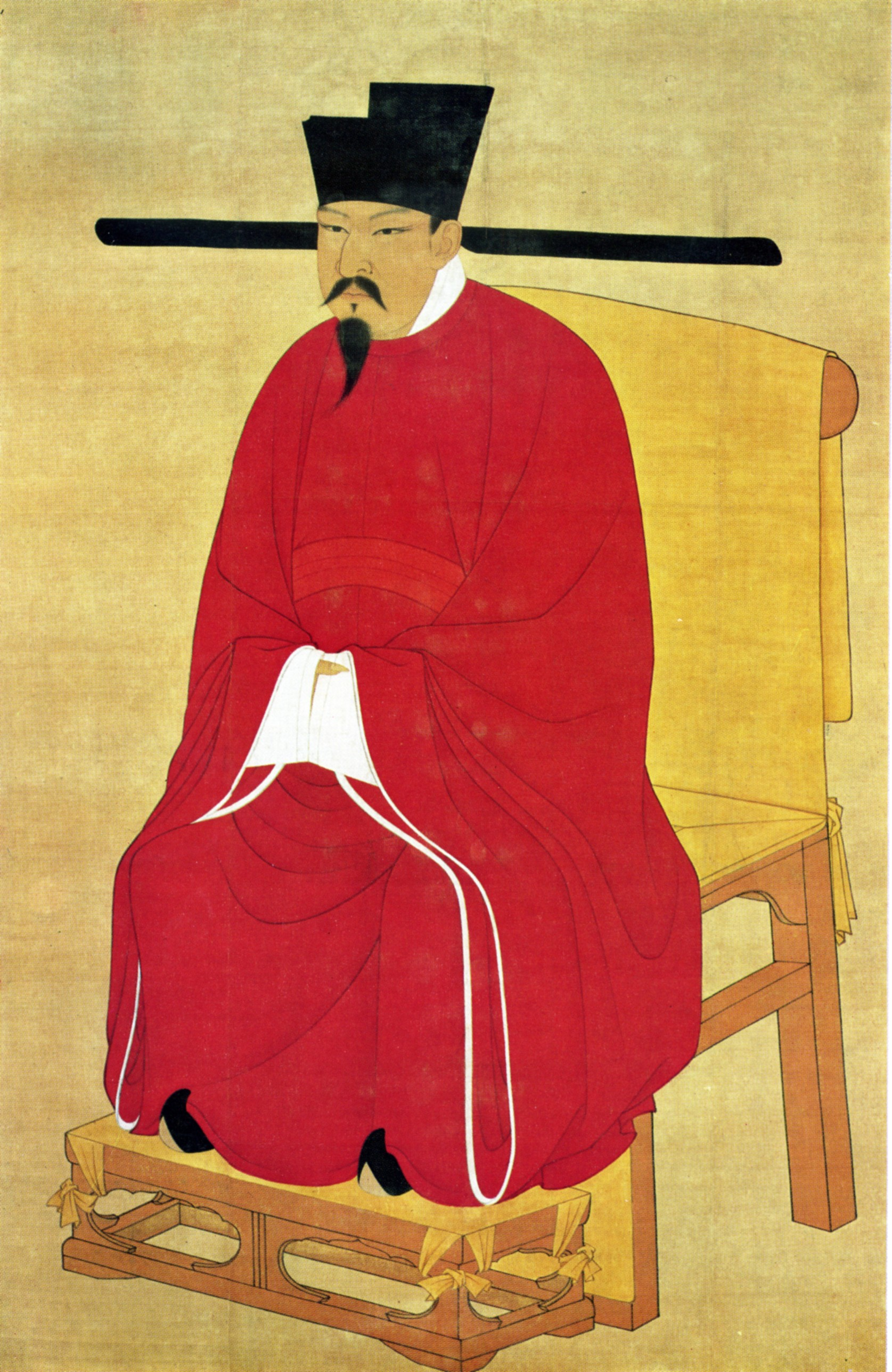
Emperor Shenzong of Song wearing Song official headwear

Zhanjiao Futou (展角幞頭, lit. "spread-horn head cover"), was the headwear of officials in medieval Chinese dynasties dated from Song to Ming. It consisted of a black hat with two wing-like flaps. The thin flaps were stiff and straight, and could extend up to almost a meter each.

It is rumoured that the founder of the Song dynasty, Emperor Taizu of Song, designed this hat so that during assemblies his officials would be kept apart by the flaps and would not whisper to each other.

The style was also later adapted (with modifications) by the Ming dynasty, authorized for court wear.

== See also ==
- Tang official headwear
- Qing official headwear
- Futou
- List of hats and headgear
- Hanfu
