= People on the Bridge =

- Russian: Люди на мосту
- Directed by: Aleksandr Zarkhi
- Written by: Sergei Antonov
- Produced by: Alexey Stefansky
- Starring: Vasili Merkuryev; Natalya Medvedeva; Aleksandra Zavyalova; Oleg Tabakov; Lyudmila Kasyanova
- Cinematography: Aleksandr Kharitonov
- Edited by: Esfir Tobak
- Music by: Rodion Shchedrin
- Production company: Mosfilm
- Release date: 1959
- Running time: 101 min.
- Country: Soviet Union
- Language: Russian

People on the Bridge (Russian: Люди на мосту, romanized: Lyudi na mostu) is a 1959 Soviet drama film directed by Aleksandr Zarkhi.

== Plot ==
After the liquidation of the central board, chief Ivan Denisovich Bulygin had to return to his former profession and become a bridge builder. The family says goodbye to a comfortable life and goes to the construction of a bridge across the Severnaya River.

== Cast ==
- Vasili Merkuryev as Ivan Bulygin
- Natalya Medvedeva as Anna Semyonovna
- Aleksandra Zavyalova as Lena
- Oleg Tabakov as Viktor Bulygin
- Lyudmila Kasyanova as Olya
- Yevgeny Shutov as Orlov
- Vladimir Druzhnikov as Odintsov
- Gleb Glebov as Paromov
- Stepan Kayukov as Ilya Ilyich Khorkov
