= The Forty-First (1927 film) =

1927 film by Yakov Protazanov

- Film poster
- Directed by: Yakov Protazanov
- Written by: Yakov Protazanov; Boris Lavrenyov (story); Boris Leonidov
- Starring: Ada Vojtsik; Ivan Koval-Samborsky
- Cinematography: Pyotr Yermolov
- Production company: Mezhrabpom-Russ
- Release date: 1 March 1927
- Running time: 66 minutes (1,885 meters)
- Country: Soviet Union
- Language: Silent film with Russian intertitles

The Forty-First (Russian: Сорок первый) is a 1927 Soviet war film directed by Yakov Protazanov based on a novel of the same name by Boris Lavrenyov.

== Synopsis ==
The Forty-First (1927)

The film is set during the Russian Civil War. Across the white sands of Central Asia, the Red Army's detachment is advancing, led by the Commissioner Yevsyukov. They are dying of thirst and are pursued by the Whites. Based on the battle account, the best shooter of Maryutka's squad killed forty Whites. In the last battle to capture the caravan, a White lieutenant aristocrat Govorukha-Otrok is captured, who was sent on a diplomatic mission from Alexander Kolchak to Anton Denikin.

Masha is entrusted with guarding him. Tensions arise between both: the officer is a well-educated aristocrat who is both amused and impressed by the crude attempts of Masha, a fisherman's orphan daughter, to compose Agitprop poetry. When their camels are stolen, their commander decides to send his captive on a boat to their headquarters in Kazalinsk via the Aral Sea. He warns Masha to not forget the mission and not hand Otrok over to the enemy regardless the circumstances. The vessel capsizes in a sudden storm, and only Masha and Otrok remain alive, stranded on an isolated island. The Red soldier treats the White officer when he catches a fever and is slowly charmed by his manners, while he is overcome with gratitude and begins to call her 'Man Friday' with affection. When she demands to know what he means, he tells her the story about Robinson Crusoe. The two fall in love and seem to forget about the war.

When a boat approaches their isle, they first think these are fishermen and run toward them. Otrok recognizes them as White soldiers and intends to join them. Masha shoots him in the back, killing him. As she realizes he is dead, she runs into the sea and embraces his corpse.

== Cast ==
- Ada Vojtsik - Maryutka
- Ivan Koval-Samborsky
- Ivan Straukh

== See also ==
- The Forty-First (1956 film)
