= The Bridge Is Built =

- Russian: Строится мост
- Directed by: Oleg Efremov; Gavriil Egiazarov
- Written by: Oleg Efremov; Naum Melnikov
- Starring: Igor Vasilev; Oleg Tabakov; Liliya Tolmacheva; Galina Volchek; Yevgeniy Evstigneev
- Cinematography: Gavriil Egiazarov
- Release date: 1965
- Country: Soviet Union
- Language: Russian

The Bridge Is Built (Russian: Строится мост) is a 1965 Soviet drama film directed by Gavriil Egiazarov and Oleg Efremov.

== Plot ==
The film tells about the Moscow correspondent who goes to Saratov, where the construction of a highway bridge across the Volga is in progress.

== Cast ==
- Igor Vasilev as Sasha Malashkin
- Oleg Tabakov as Sergei Zaytsev
- Liliya Tolmacheva as Perova (as Lidiya Tolmachyova)
- Galina Volchek as Young Girl
- Yevgeny Yevstigneyev as Sinaysky
- Lyudmila Gurchenko as Zhenya
- Oleg Dal as Yulian
- Nina Doroshina as Sasha Malashkina
