= Boris Lavrenyov =

Russian writer (1891–1959)

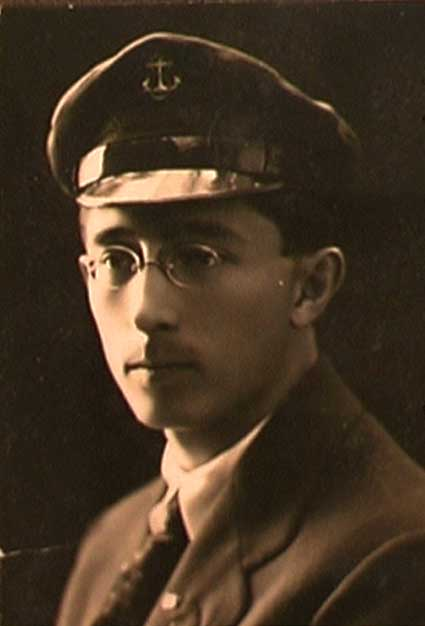
- Born: Boris Andreyevich Sergeyev; 16 July 1891; Kherson, Russian Empire
- Died: 7 January 1959 (aged 67); Moscow, Russian SFSR, Soviet Union

Boris Andreyevich Lavrenyov (Russian: Борис Андреевич Лавренёв) (real name Sergeyev), (16 July [O.S. 4 July] 1891 – 7 January 1959) was a Soviet Russian writer and playwright.

Lavrenyov was born to the family of a literature teacher. He received his education at the Law department of the Moscow University. At the time he wrote poetry and joined a Moscow Futurists group called Mezonin poezii (A Mezzanine of Poetry). He fought in World War I and the Russian Civil War. During the latter he took part in combat in Turkmenistan, served as a commander of an armoured train, and also wrote for the Red Army military newspaper. His poetry was first published in 1911 and his prose works in 1924. He was twice awarded the Stalin Prize – in 1946 and 1950.

Lavrenyov's novel, "The Forty-First", first published in Zvezda in 1924) was twice adapted to film, in 1927 by Yakov Protazanov and in 1956 by Grigory Chukhray.

== English translations ==
- The Forty-First, Foreign Languages Publishing House, 1926. English summary from Sovlit.net
- Such a Simple Thing, from Such a Simple Thing and Other Soviet Stories, Foreign Languages Publishing House, 1959. from Archive.org
- The Courageous Heart, Progress Publishers, 1978.
- The Heavenly Cap, from The Fatal Eggs and Other Soviet Satire, Grove Press, 1994.

== See also ==
- The Seventh Companion
