= Qing official headwear =

Headwear of officials during the Qing dynasty of China

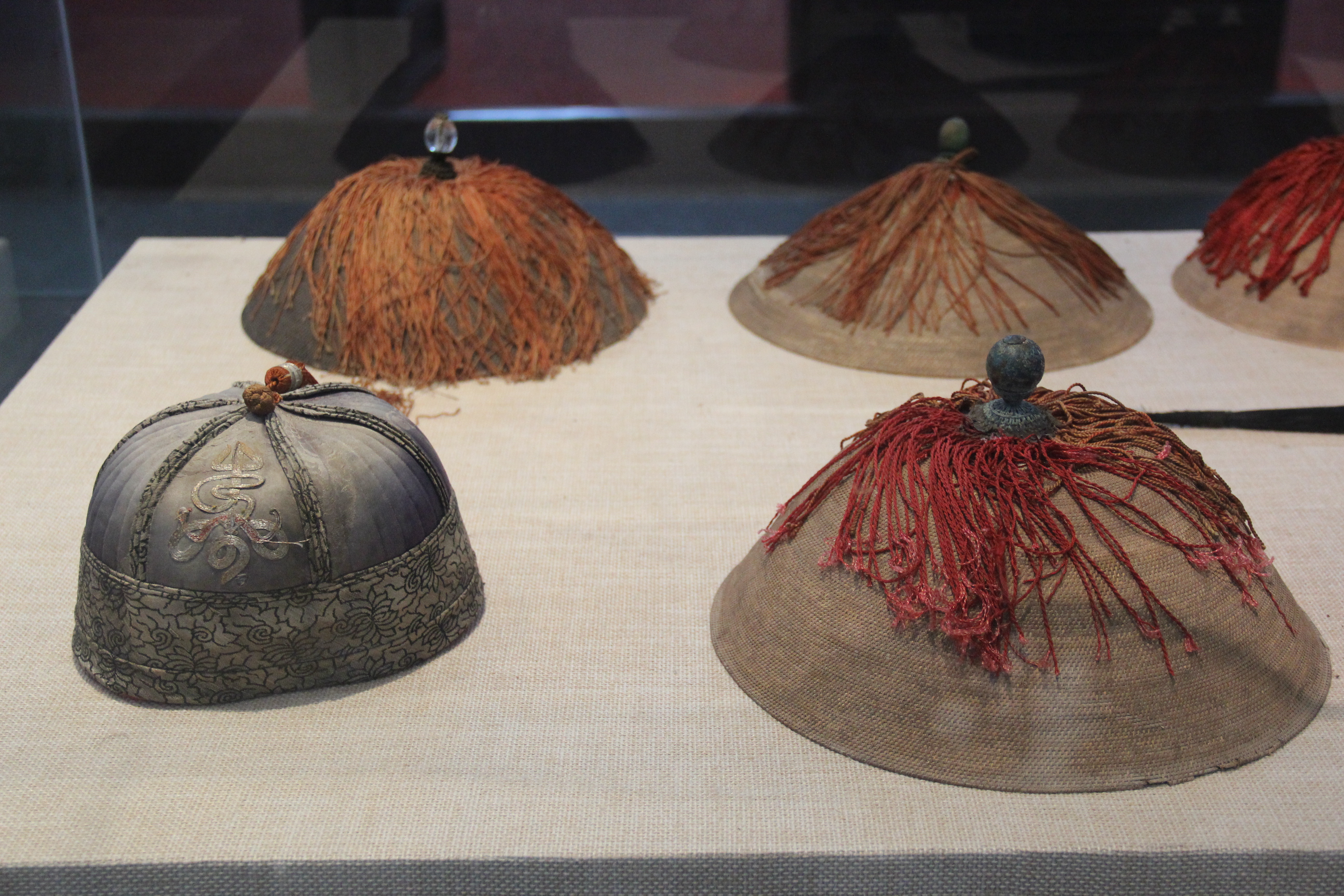
- Qing-era official headwear in a museum, Nanchang, Jiangxi

Chinese name
- Chinese: 清代官帽
- Literal meaning: Qing dynasty official hat
Transcriptions
Standard Mandarin
- Hanyu Pinyin: qīngdài guānmào

English language name
- English language: Official hats of the Qing dynasty / Qing official headwear / Mandarin hat

The Qing official headwear or Qingdai guanmao (Chinese: 清代官帽; pinyin: qīngdài guānmào; lit. 'Qing dynasty official hat'), also referred as the Official hats of the Qing dynasty or Mandarin hat in English, is a generic term which refers to the types of guanmao (Chinese: 官帽; pinyin: guānmào; lit. 'official hat'), a headgear, worn by the officials of the Qing dynasty in China. The Qing official headwear typically forms part of the qizhuang system as opposed to the hanfu system and were completely different from the types of guanmao used in the previous dynasties. There were various forms of the Qing official headwear, and some were designed to be worn based on the winter or summer seasons; while others used varieties of decorations and adornment, such as the use of peacock feathers which could vary between one and three peacock eyes; these peacock feathers were bestowed by the Emperor to his officials who had accomplished meritorious services and the greatest number of peacock eyes represents the highest honour bestowed.

== Types of the Qing official headwear ==
=== Xiaomao ===
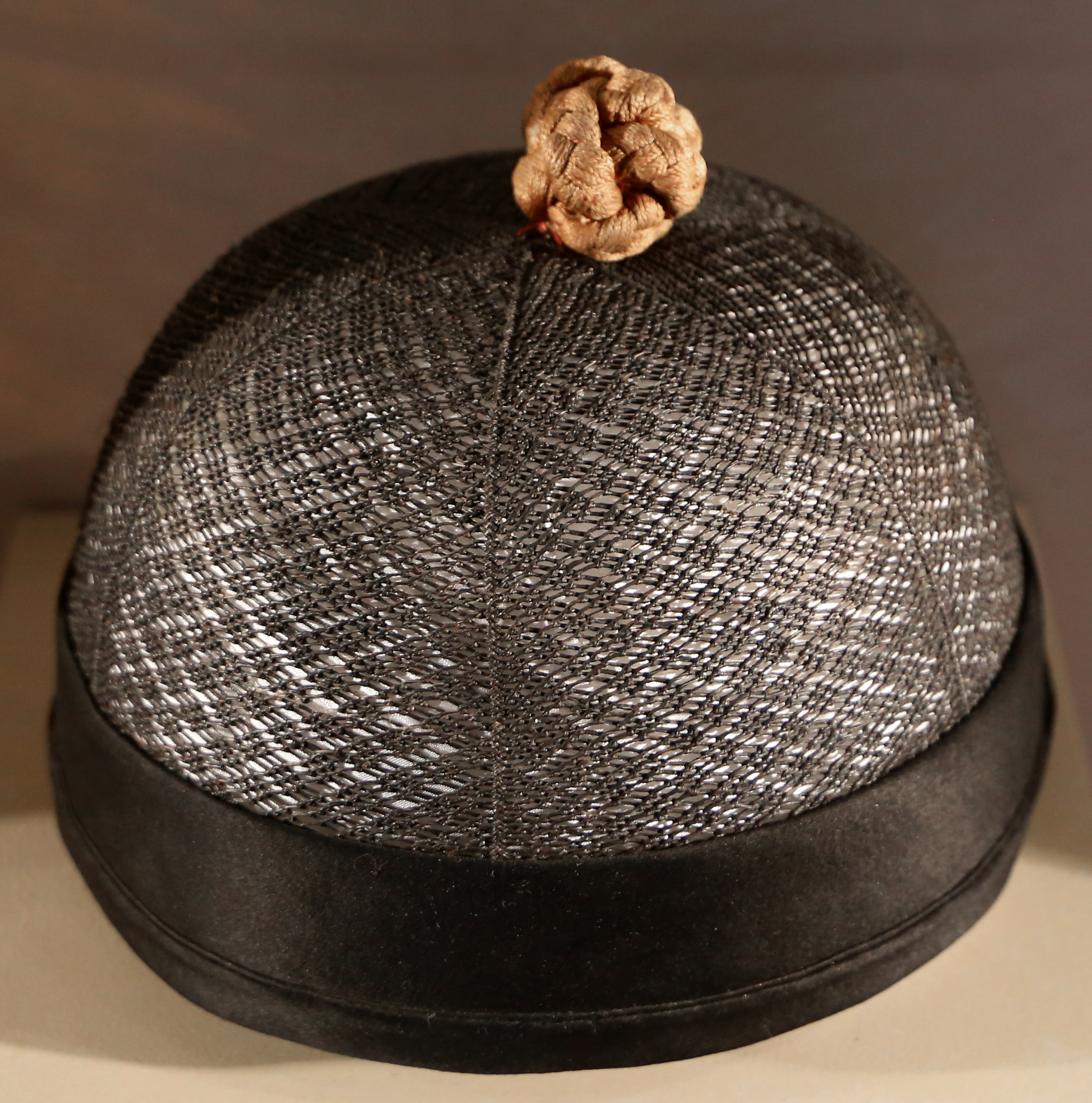
A 19th-century xiaomao

Xiaomao (Chinese: 小帽, "little cap") was a type of daily hat worn by the officials of the Qing dynasty; however, it actually dated from the late Ming dynasty and was popular from the late Ming to the end of the Republic of China period. The xiaomao was mostly black in colour and was made of 6 separate pieces and was therefore also called the "six-in-one hat"; it was made out of gauze in summer and autumn while damask was used in spring and winter seasons. The inside of the hat however was red in colour; there was a knot on the top of the hat which was typically made of red threads. When worn by common people, it was known as the guapimao or melon rind cap. The knot was black except when there was a funeral, in which case the knot was white.

=== Nuanmao ===
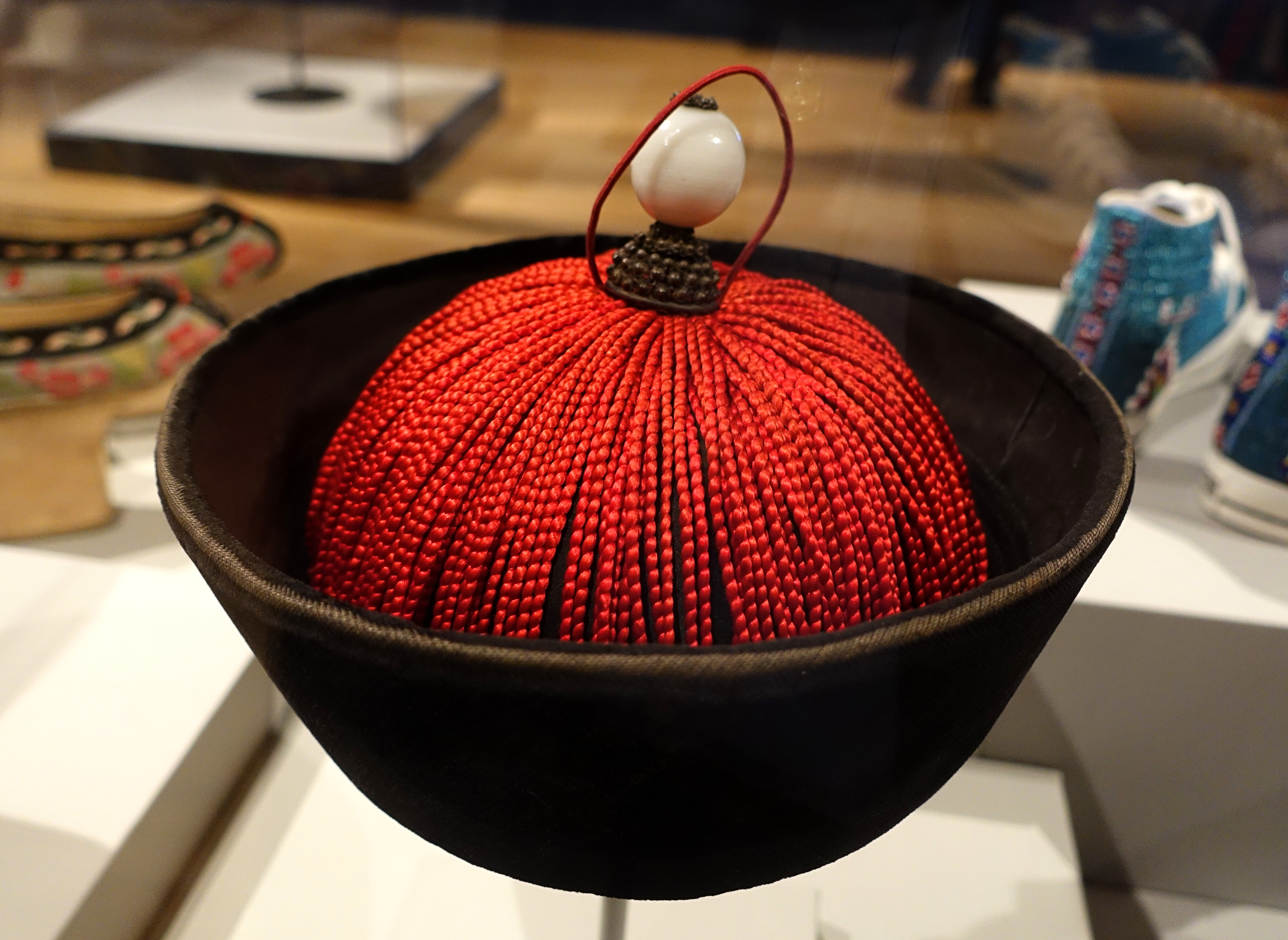
Nuanmao

Nuanmao (Chinese: 暖帽; lit. 'warm hat') was the official hat worn by civil officials in the Qing dynasty during the winter seasons.

=== Liangmao ===
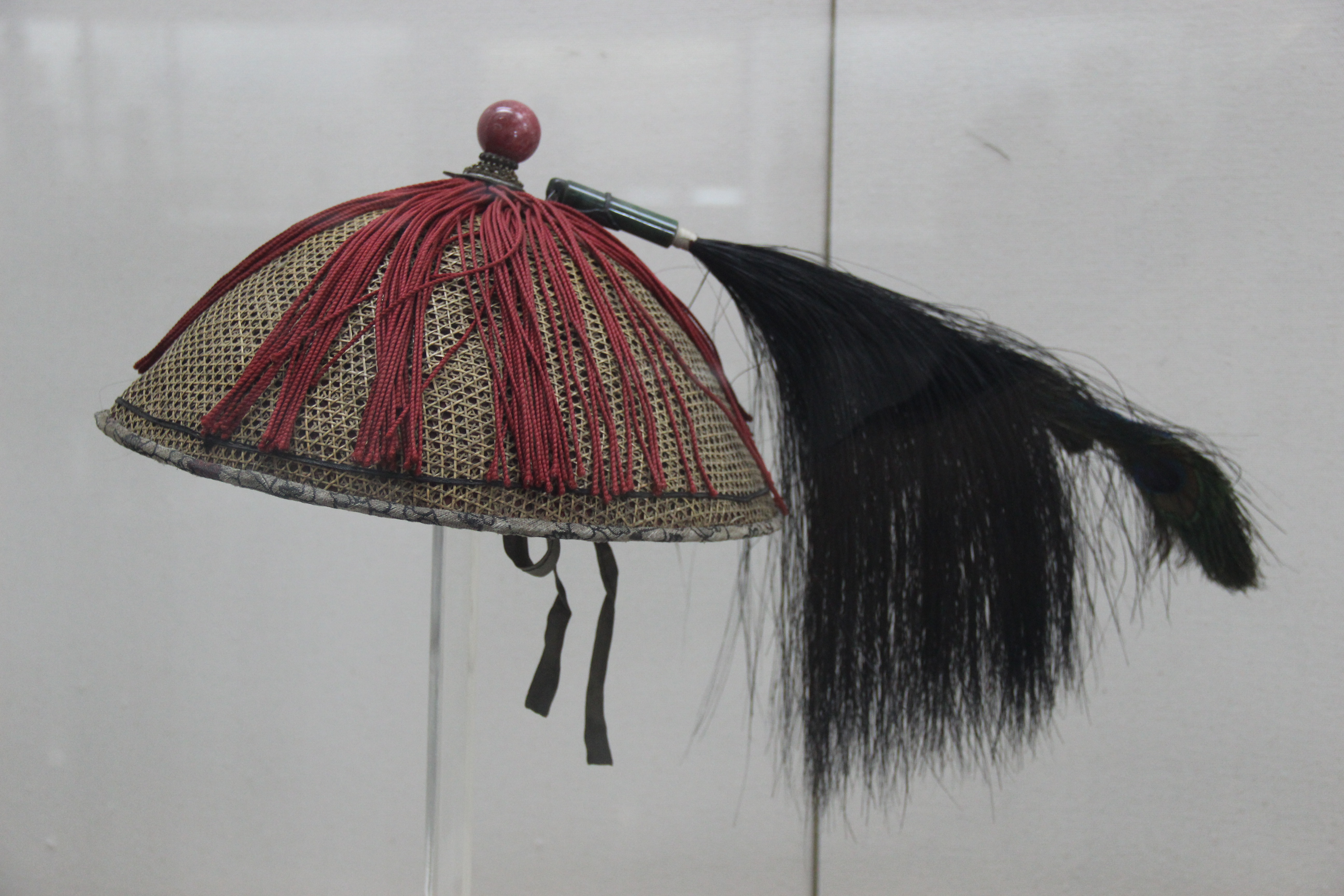
Liangmao

Liangmao (Chinese: 凉帽; lit. 'cool hat') was the official hat worn by the officials in the Qing dynasty during the summer seasons; it was a typical form of Manchu headwear items in qizhuang.

== Construction and design ==
It consisted of a black velvet cap in winter, or a hat woven in rattan or similar materials in summer, both with a button on the top. The button or knob would become a finial during formal court ceremonies held by the Emperor.

=== Jewelry and accessories ===
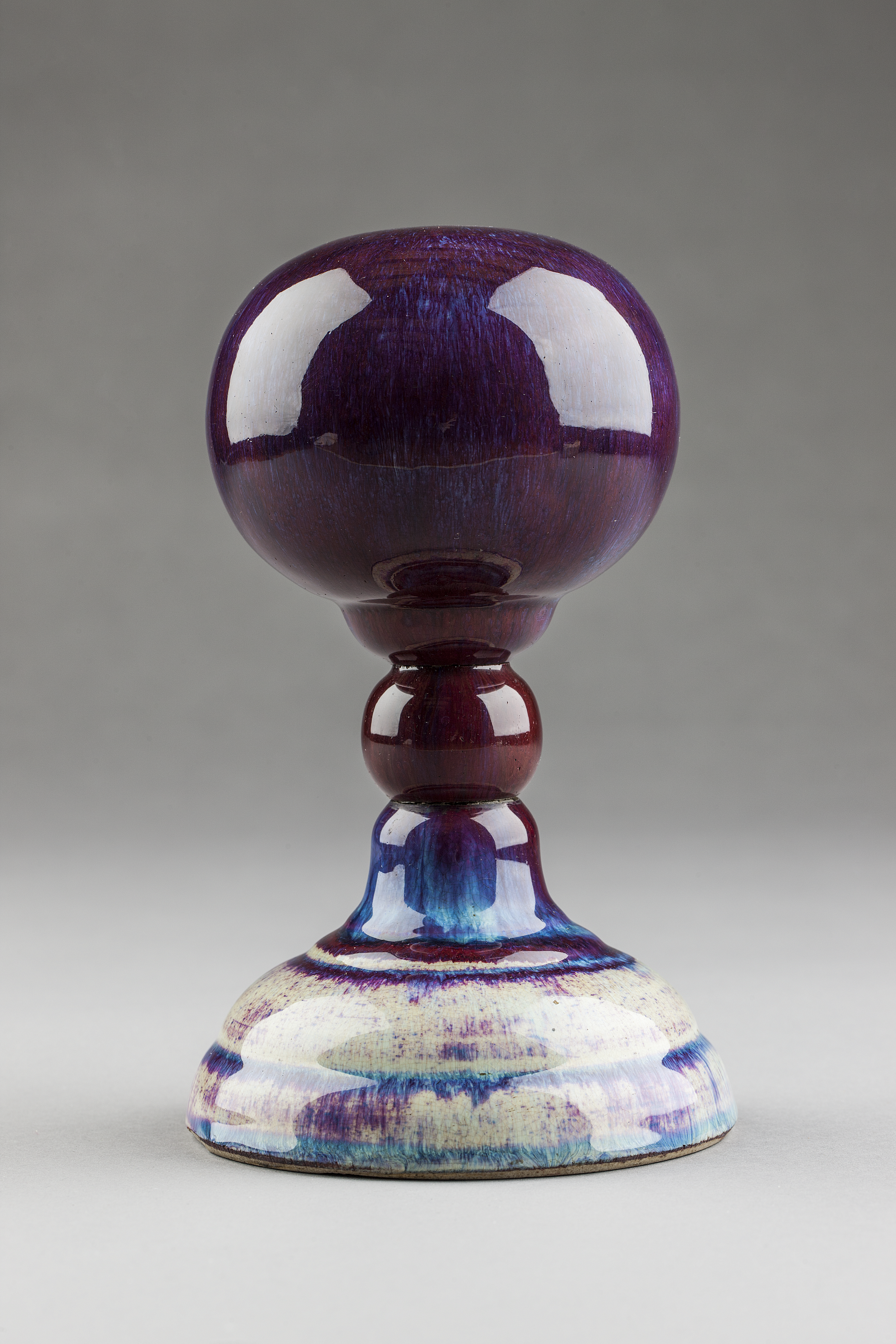
Porcelain hat pin

Officials would have to change their tops on the hat, for non-formal ceremonies or daily businesses. Red silk tassels extended down from the finial to cover the hat, and a large peacock feather (with one to three "eyes") could be attached to the back of the hat, should the merit of wearing it have been granted by the emperor.

The colour and shape of the finial depended on the wearer's grade:

- The royalty and nobility used various numbers of pearls.
- An officer of the first grade wore a translucent red ball (originally ruby); second grade, solid red ball (originally coral); third grade, translucent blue ball (originally sapphire); fourth grade, solid blue ball (originally lapis lazuli); fifth grade, translucent white ball (originally crystal); sixth grade, solid white ball (originally mother of pearl). Officers of the seventh to ninth grade wore gold or clear amber balls of varied designs.

== See also ==
- Tang official headwear
- Song official headwear
- List of headgear
- Red hat merchant
- Qizhuang
- Futou
- Hanfu
