= A Man Changes Skin =

- Directed by: Rafail Perelshtejn
- Written by: L. Rutitski; Dmitri Vasiliu
- Starring: See below
- Cinematography: Mark Kaplan
- Music by: S. Sayfiddinov
- Release date: 1960
- Country: Soviet Union
- Language: Russian

A Man Changes Skin (Russian: Человек меняет кожу, romanized: Chelovek menyaet kozhu) is a 1960 Soviet mystery drama film directed by Rafail Perelshtejn.

== Plot ==
The construction of the Vakhsh Canal is underway which is one of the largest constructions of the first Five-Year Plan. Two Americans come by contract; a grizzled spy Colonel Bailey (Boris Vinogradov), who introduces himself as a harmless traveler by the name of Mr. Murray, only later to be caught red-handed and unmasked, and Mr. Clark (Sergei Kurilov), who arrives to the canal to "make money" and gradually becomes convinced that work and politics are not that different concepts. Not accepting socialism he is quite sympathetic to the enthusiasm of the Soviet people. Love for the Komsomol translator Maria Polozova (Izolda Izvitskaya) helps Clark to comprehend what is happening. In the middle of the construction is the engineer Urtabaev (Gurminch Zavkibekov), a strong, bright man, one of the first representatives of the Tajik intelligentsia. He is suspected of sabotage. However Urtabaev is not one of those who breaks under pressure - he proves his innocence concerning the sabotage and remains as one of the main construction authorities. On the festive opening day of the canal the last Basmachi gang is defeated in a fight which kills Komsomol leader Karim (Djakhon Sidmuradov).

== Cast ==
- Sergei Kurilov as Mr. Clark
- Izolda Izvitskaya as Maria Polozova
- Gurminch Zavkibekov as Saeed Urtabaev
- Boris Vinogradov as Colonel Bailey / Mr. Murray
- Asli Burkhanov as Hojiyarov
- Sergei Golovanov as Morozov
- Abdulkhair Kasymov as Fatkulla
- Sergei Stolyarov as Sinitsin
- Natalia Medvedeva as Valentina Sinitsina
- Ninel Myshkova as Yelena Myshkova
- Pavel Volkov as Savelich
- Vladimir Yemelyanov as Komarenko
- Djakhon Sidmuradov as Karim

== Remake ==
In 1979, director Boris Kimyagarov shot a film with the same title, where the main roles were played by Igor Kostolevsky, Boris Khmelnitsky, Larisa Udovichenko, Yuri Gorobets and Valentin Nikulin.
