= Natalya Medvedeva (actress) =

Russian actress (1915–2007)

- Born: Natalya Pavlovna Medvedeva; 18 December 1915; Petrograd, Russia
- Died: 12 August 2007 (aged 91); Moscow, Russia
- Occupation(s): Stage and film actress
- Years active: 1943–1979

Natalya Pavlovna Medvedeva (Russian: Наталья Павловна Медведева, 18 December 1915 – 12 August 2007) was a Soviet film and stage actress.

Medvedeva's mother was an actress, whereas her father, Pavel Nikolaevich Medvedev, was a literary scholar and President of St. Petersburg Union of Writers; he was executed in 1938 and rehabilitated in 1957. Medvedeva studied acting at the Saint Petersburg State Theatre Arts Academy (1939–1943). She was already married by then, and when her husband was sent to Sverdlovsk, she followed him there and in 1943–1944 acted at the Sverdlovsk drama theater. Next year the family moved to Moscow, where Medveva worked in drama theaters and since 1952 acted in films and TV series. She retired in 1979 and focused on raising her daughter Galina.

== Filmography ==
- Prestuplenie (1976) – school director Lidiya Dorokhina
- Dom i khozyain (1967) – Zina
- Lyudi i zveri (1962) – Valentina Pavlova
- Chelovek menyaet kozhu (1960)
- Lyudi na mostu (1960) – Anna Semyonovna
- Trizhdy voskresshiy (1960) – Anna Shmelyeva
- Chelovek menyaet kozhu (1959) – Valentina Sinitsyna
- Lyudi na mostu (1959) – Anna Semyonova Bulygina
- Ilya Muromets (1956) – Princess Apraksia
- Za vitrinoi univermaga (1955) – Anna Andreeva
- The Return of Vasili Bortnikov (1952) – Avdot'ya
