= Cinema of Tajikistan =

- No. of screens: 67 (2011)
  - Per capita: 1.0 per 100,000 (2011)

Produced feature films (2009)
- Fictional: 1
- Animated: 0
- Documentary: 7

Number of admissions (2009)
- Total: 264,000

In parallel to what happened in other Soviet republics, a cinema of Tajikistan was promoted by the Soviet state, and declined in the first years after the independence, before being revitalized through the efforts of the new government.

== Origins: the 1920s and 1930s ==
The Soviet state founded Tajikfilm in the 1920s. Initially, its main productions were monthly newsreels titled Soviet Tajikistan. Tajikfilm was led by Artem Shevich, Nikolay Gezulin, and Vasiliy Kuzin. Their 1929 footage of the arrival of the first train ever in Dushanbe is of historical significance. In 1930, Tajikkino (later called Stalinabad Film Studio and Tajikfilm since the 1950s) was established to produce movies locally.

The first productions of Tajikkino were documentaries, some of them directed by the Tajik actor Kamil Yarmatov, who had already starred in Soviet films realized outside of Tajikistan. In 1932, Yarmatov directed Honored Right and On the Faraway Frontier. Both were Soviet patriotic documentaries, the first about the mobilization of Tajiks in the Soviet army, and the second describing the life of border guards at the Afghan frontier.

The first short feature film was also produced in 1932, When Emirs Die by Lydia Pechorina. 1934 saw the first full-length feature film produced in Tajikistan, Emigrant, with Yarmatov both directing and starring as the leading actor. The script had been written by the well-known Armenian poet Gabriel El-Registan and the film was approved by the authorities for distribution throughout the Soviet Union, as it argued that Tajiks who remained in Socialist Tajikistan had a better life than those who emigrated from the Soviet Union. It was one of the last Soviet silent movies.

In 1934, leading Russian director Lev Kuleshov was sent to Tajikistan to improve the quality of local movies. He worked for two years at a movie based on the novel Dokhunda by Tajik national poet Sadriddin Ayni, but the project was regarded with suspicion by the authorities as possibly exciting Tajik nationalism, and stopped. No footage survives.

In 1938 and 1939, Tajikkino produced two additional feature films, Garden by Nikolay Dostal and Friends Meet Again by Yarmatov.

== World War II ==
In 1940, Yarmatov was allowed to move to Uzbekistan, where producing films was easier, and Tajikistan lost its only professional director. In the following years, however, because of the war, some Russian directors and studios were evacuated to Tajikistan, and produced films there. When they returned home after the war, the production of feature films in Tajikistan came to a halt for more than ten years, although documentaries were still produced, and one of them, Tajikistan (1946), won the bronze medal at the Venice Film Festival.

== From the 1950s to the independence ==
Production of feature films in Tajikistan started again in the mid-1950s, when director Boris (Besion) Kimyagarov (1920–1979) was finally able to get approval for a movie version of Dokhunda (1956). A new generation of professionally trained Tajik directors emerged, with successful productions such as I Met a Girl (1957), the first Tajik musical, directed by Rafail Perel’shtein (Pearlstein), Children of Pamirs (1963) by Vladimir Motyl, Fate of the Poet (1959), by Kimyagarov, on the life of the Persian poet, born in present-day Tajikistan, Rudaki. Kimyagarov went on to produce a cycle of four films based on the epic poem Shahnameh by Ferdowsi: The Flag of the Smith (1961), The Legend of Rustam (1970), Rustam and Sukhrab (1971), and The Legend of Siavush (1976). Tokhir Sabirov in turn directed a trilogy based on One Thousand and One Nights, One More Night of Scheherazade (1984), New Tales of Scheherazade (1986), The Last Night of Scheherazade (1987).

Kimyagarov also directed A Man Changes Skin in 1960. Between the directors of the same generation one can also find the names of Mukadas Makhmudov, Anvar Turaev and Suvat Khamidov.

== Cinema in independent Tajikistan ==
Independence and the end of Soviet state support almost destroyed Tajik cinema. The most talented directors, including Bakhtyar Khudojnazarov and Jamshed Usmonov emigrated abroad. Iran offered some support to develop again a Tajik movie production. In turn, some Tajik directors worked in co-operation with Iranian companies. On November 25, 2004, Tajikistan passed a "Law about Cinema," aimed at promoting local productions and films in Tajik language. In 2006, a Tajik-Iranian film, Bihisht faqat baroi murdagon, was presented at the Cannes Film Festival. Its director, Jamshed Usmonov, was already known in France for his works Flight of the Bumblebee (co-produced with Min Byung-Hun) and particularly Angel on the Right also chosen at Cannes in 2002.

In 2004, the first Didor International Film Festival was organized in Dushanbe, celebrating the 75th anniversary of Tajik cinema. In subsequent years, the festival significantly contributed to the promotion of Tajik films. Two direct-to-video films were produced in Tajikistan in 2004 and 2005, Statue of Love (2004) by Umedsho Mirzoshirinov and Wanderer (2005) by Gulandom Muhabbatova and Daler Rahmatov. In 2009, True Noon by Nosir Saidov became the first Tajik film to be distributed in Tajikistan in 18 years, i.e. since independence. It was also aired at the International Film Festival Rotterdam.

The 2010s saw an improved quality of Tajik films, with the emergence of new directors trained not only in Iran but also in the U.S., Russia, South Korea, and India, and thus open to multiple influences. Films produced in this decade included Teacher (2014) by Nosir Saidov, about the last day of an old teacher in a village torn between Soviet heritage and Islamic radicalization; Dream of an Ape (2016) by Rumi Shoazimov, the first Tajik horror movie; and Air Safar (2015) by Daler Rakhmatov, a comedy where a Tajik farmer and a Frenchman look so similar that they are consistently mistaken for each other. Mushkilkusho (2016) by Umedsho Mirzoshirinov was shot by using the endangered Pamir languages. It told the story of a Pamiri girl in Moscow and her contrasted love for a Russian boy, and won the award for best Tajik film at the 2016 Didor Festival. Sugdsinamo, a studio based in the Northern part of Tajikistan, produced in 2018 Tangno (2018) by Muhiddin Muzaffar, a critical look at the power of tradition in the area of Panjakent, where a boy who has not been circumcised on time because of his family's financial difficulties is discriminated by the villagers.

On December 27, 2017, the government merged the State Tajikfilm Studio and the State Unitary Tajikkino Enterprise of Film and Video Distribution into the State Tajikfilm Institution, a move aimed at further promoting movies produced in Tajikistan.

== See also ==
- Cinema of the world
- List of Tajik films
