= List of hanfu headwear =

List of Han Chinese headgear

Chinese headwear has a long history. According to some scholars, China used to be called "the Kingdom of Headwear" by people due to its variety of colourful and artistic style of hair ornament. There were various categories for headwear including guan (Chinese: 冠; pinyin: guān; lit. 'crown/hat/cap'), mao (Chinese: 帽; lit. 'hat/cap'), jin (Chinese: 巾; lit. 'kerchief'), ze (Chinese: 帻; lit. 'turban'), and mian (Chinese: 冕; lit. 'crown'). Chinese people also wore Chinese hairpins. Chinese women, in particular, like to use flowers (either natural or artificial) as hair decorations for centuries; they also wore shubi in their hair and sometimes wore the honggaitou on their weddings. Most Chinese headwear did not survive the Qing dynasty due to the Manchu-imposed tifayifu policy.

== Types of headwear for males ==
Headwear of Men
Name		Definition	Suitable age	Match	Period	Images
Mian Guan (冕冠)	Shier liu mian (十二旒冕)	Twelve-tasselled Crown. Initially all Mian Guan were worn by emperors, later emperors only wore this type.	Adult		Zhou – Ming	
Mian Guan (冕冠)	Jiuliu mian (九旒冕)	Nine-tasselled Crown. Worn by dukes and crown prince's servants.	Adult		Zhou – Han	
Mian Guan (冕冠)	Others	Baliu mian (八旒冕): Eight-tasselled Crown. Worn by princes and dukes. Qiliu mian (七旒冕): Seven-tasselled Crown. Worn by ministers. Wuliu mian (五旒冕): Five-tasselled Crown. Worn by viscounts and barons.				
Juebian (爵弁)		Noble Cap. Ceremonial crown worn by shidafu (士大夫) nobles, worn during Guan Li and other rites such as marriage ceremonies.	Adult		Zhou – Ming	
Pibian (皮弁)		Leather Crown. Embedded with jades. Worn by all nobles.	Adult		Zhou – Ming	
Liang Guan (梁冠)	Tongtian Guan (通天冠)/ Gaoshan Guan (高山冠)	Sky-reaching Crown/High Mountain Crown. Worn by emperors in special occasions.	Adult	tongtianguanfu (通天冠服)	Qin – Ming	
Liang Guan (梁冠)	Yuanyou Guan (远游冠)	Travel Crown. Worn by emperors and princes. Similar to Tongtian Guan. Also worn by dukes in Han dynasty.	Adult		Qin – Ming	Imperial Encyclopaedia - Ceremonial Usages - pic369 - 遠遊冠
Liang Guan (梁冠)	Diaochan Guan (貂蟬冠)	Mink's Tail and Cicada's Wing Crown. Worn by emperor's servants and government officials. See also: Long Guan, Wu Guan.	Adult		Tang – Ming	
Liang Guan (梁冠)	Jinxian Guan (進賢冠)	Recommending Crown. Worn by Confucian scholars and civil government officials. After the Xin dynasty, it was worn with the jieze (介帻) with the crown folded on top, later becoming one headwear. Number of beams across the crown determines rank	Adult		Zhou – Ming	
Liang Guan (梁冠)	Zhongjing Guan (忠靖冠)	Loyal and stable crown. Worn by retired officials.	Adult		Ming	
Wu guan (武冠)/Wu bian (武弁)/Wubian daguan (武弁大冠)		Military Crown. Wuguan was derived from the Zhaohuiwenguan (趙惠文冠), designed by King Wuling of Zhao, which was ornamented with a dang (璫; a gold ornament in the form of animals, such as dragons, cicada, and people) on the front and with sable's tail. By the Han dynasty, military caps called wubian were commonly worn by soldiery, with formal guan variants worn by high-ranking military officials and imperial bodyguards, which were decorated with long-tailed pheasant's tail feathers as a symbol of martial prowess.	Adult		Zhou-Jin	
Shufa Guan (束发冠)		Hair-gathering Crown. A small cap to gather hair inside, fixed with long hairpin. Daily wear of all male. Mini size, sometimes in shapes of Liangguan.	Adult		Five Dynasties - Ming	
Chang Guan (长冠)		Long Crown, also known as "Liu family crown" (刘氏冠) or "Magpie tail crown" (鹊尾冠). Designed and first worn by Emperor Gaozu of Han based on Chu headwear. Later worn by Han dynasty's emperors and high officials during ceremonies.	Adult		Han	
Long Guan (籠冠)		"Basket hat". Developed from the Wubian ("武弁") hat, alternatively also known as Wuguan "武冠", worn by military officials. Helmets or tall peaked caps; it extends down over the ears and neck. It is semi-transparent.	Adult		Jin - Ming	
Lianhua Guan (莲花冠)		Lotus Crown. First worn by highest rank Taoist Master, later also worn by the nobility. Currently used by Taoist priests.	Adult		Tang - Modern times	
Futou (襆頭)	Chuijiao Putou (垂腳襆頭)	Head cover/Head wrap. An early form of informal headwear dates back as early as Jin dynasty that later developed into several variations for wear in different occasions.	Adult		Tang – Ming	
Futou (襆頭)	Zhanjiao Putou (展角幞頭)	"Spread-horn head cover". Designed by Emperor Taizu. Elongated horns on both sides can keep the distance between officials so they couldn't whisper to each other during court assemblies.	Adult	Changfu (Tang), Gongfu (Song-Ming)	Tang – Ming	
Futou (襆頭)	Zhanchi Putou (展翅幞頭)	"Spread-wing head cover". Commonly as "wushamao" (乌纱帽), or "black-muslin hat". Standard headwear of officials during the Ming dynasty. The term wushamao is still frequently used as Chinese slang referring to government positions.	Adult		Ming	
Futou (襆頭)	Yishan Guan (翼善冠)	Philanthropy Crown, with wings folded upwards. Worn by emperors and princes of the Ming dynasty, as well as kings of many China's tributaries. Sometimes decorated with jewels and dragons.	Adult		Ming	
Futou (襆頭)	Tang jin (唐巾)	Based on the futou, worn by commoners, particularly scholars.	Adult		Song - Ming	
Gaowu mao (高屋帽)	Baisha mao (白紗帽)	Also known as white gauze hat. It was worn by the sovereigns of Liu-Song and Southern Qi, it was later inherited by the Sui dynasty.	Adult	White gauze hat.	Northern and Southern dynasties – Sui	
Gaowu mao (高屋帽)	Wusha Gaowu mao (烏紗高屋帽)	High reach black gauze hat. See also, Long Guan	Adult		Northern and Southern dynasties – Song	
Gaowu mao (高屋帽)	Zhulu mao (逐鹿帽)		Adult		Northern and Southern dynasties	
Damao (大帽)		Round hat with wide brim. Worn by people of lower-ranking occupations, such as government clerks and family servants.	Adult		Yuan-Ming	
Chanzongmao (缠棕帽)		A damao made of rattan, sometimes decorated with feathers attached on top of the hat. Military attire.	Adult		Yuan-Ming	
Liuheyitong mao (六合一統帽) / Xiao mao (小帽)/ Guapi mao (瓜皮帽)		'Six-part' United hat. Name originate from Ming dynasty's founder Hongwu Emperor uniting China. The hat would later develop into the "Guapi mao"(瓜皮帽) skullcap in the Qing dynasty. Worn by commoners.	Adult		Ming - Qing	
Zhanli (毡笠)		Wide brimmed hat.	Adult		Song	
Jin (巾)/ Tou jin (头巾)/ Zhajin (扎巾)		Headscarf worn by commoners, tied around the head or sometimes the topknot to protect the hair. In the Song dynasty, the headscarf was also secured with a decorative ring.			Zhou - Ming	
Jinze (巾帻) /Jieze (介帻) / Pingshanze (平上幘)		A cylindrical cap; it has a higher back and lower front. Originally it was a soldiers' headscarf that later developed into a head covering cap in the Han Dynasty and adopted into widespread use. A red jinze called chize (赤帻) was used by military personnel, while another variant called jieze(介帻) is used by civil officials and servants. Later developed into the pingshangze, which had a flatter top decorated with a bamboo slip, worn by military officials.			Han - Tang dynasty	
Cheng zi guan (程子冠) / Fangshan jin (方山巾)		Worn by Cheng Yi and Cheng Hao. Developed from Dongpo jin. Formal wear, popular with Neo-Confucian scholars.	Adult		Song – Ming	
Chunyang jin (純陽巾) / Letian jin (樂天巾)		Named after Lü Chunyang and Bai Letian. Popularly worn by scholar-gentry and Taoists.	Adult		Ming - Modern times	
Dongpo jin (東坡巾)		Named after and supposedly worn by Su Dongpo, but originated from Five Dynasties period. Worn by commoners, particularly scholar-gentry.	Adult		Five Dynasties and Ten Kingdoms - Ming	
Fu jin (幅巾)		Popularly worn by scholar-gentry.	Adult		Han – Ming	
Hunyuan jin (混元巾)		Worn by Quanzhen School Taoists, popularised during the Qing dynasty.	Adult		Ming - Modern times	
Jie jin (結巾) / Jiang jin (將巾)		Also known as "general's headscarf". Worn by tying the two ends of the kerchief on top of the head. Commonly worn by military personnel.	Adult		Song - Ming	
Guan jin (綸巾)/Zhuge jin (諸葛巾)		Originally a style of fujin, later resembling a liangguan. Named after Zhuge Liang, who wore a guanjin.	Adult		Han – Ming	
Huayang jin (華陽巾)		Worn by Taoists.	Adult		Five dynasties – Qing	
Lei jin (雷巾)		Shaped similarly to ru jin, only with a fabric hanging from the back of the head, with two soft ribbons. Also popularly worn by Taoists.	Adult		Ming – Qing	
Piaopiao jin (飘飘巾) / Piao jin (飘巾)		Popular among scholar-gentry. Named after the flowing ribbons behind it. Later inspired opera costume such as qiaoliangjin (桥梁巾) for its refined and cultured appearance.	Adult		Ming	
Li jin (吏巾)		Worn by minor government officials, it resembles a wushamao but made with softer material and has a square top.	Adult		Ming	
Ru jin (儒巾)		Ruist scarf. Popularly worn by scholars, especially those who have yet to earn the title of Juren at the imperial examination. Believed to be based on a headwear called zhangfu (章甫).	Adult		Song – Ming	
Sifang pingding jin (四方平定巾) / Fang jin (方巾) / Sifang jin (四方巾)		First worn and named by Yang Weizhen. Emperor Zhu Yuanzhang was pleased by its appearance and name, and ordered it to be used by scholars and minor government clerks.	Adult		Ming	
Wangjin (網巾)		Worn under headwear to secure and protect the hair.	Adult		Ming	
Xiaoyao jin (逍遥巾)		Also known as "Heye jin" (荷叶巾), "Huadingtou jin" (花顶头巾). Worn by commoners, later adopted by Taoists. Originally worn by scholars to differentiate from peasants.	Adult		Song - Ming	
Yun jin (雲巾)		Modeled after the Zhongjin guan, but worn by the scholar-gentry. Named after the "cloud" shapes formed on the sides.	Adult		Ming	
Zaoli jin (皁隸巾)		Named after and worn by yamen runners. Due to the low status and the headwear not able to cover the forehead, it is also nicknamed "faceless guan"(無顏之冠)	Adult		Ming	
Zhouzi jin (周子巾)		Worn by commoners.	Adult		Song – Ming	
Zhuangzi jin (莊子巾)		Also called "Dao jin" (道巾). Named after Zhuangzi. Worn by common scholars and Taoists, later exclusively by Taoist priests.	Adult		Song – Modern times	
Beiye jin (貝葉巾)		Resembling palm tree leaves. Worn by commoners, particularly scholar-gentry.	Adult		Ming	
Chanfu jin (蟬腹巾)		Resembling cicada's thorax. Worn by commoners, particularly scholar-gentry.	Adult		Ming	
Kui jin (葵巾)		Resembling flower petals. Worn by commoners, particularly scholar-gentry.	Adult		Ming	
Qinwei jin (琴尾巾)		Resembling a part of qin. Worn by commoners, particularly scholar-gentry.	Adult		Ming	
Ruyi jin (如意巾)		Worn by commoners, particularly scholar-gentry.	Adult		Ming	
Sandaopenglai jin (三島蓬萊巾)		Representing the three islands of Mount Penglai. Worn by commoners, particularly scholar-gentry.	Adult		Ming	
Xiantao jin (仙桃巾)		Resembling Peaches of Immortality. Worn by commoners, particularly scholar-gentry.	Adult		Ming	
Xizhi jin (羲之巾)		Worn by commoners, particularly scholar-gentry.	Adult		Ming	
Zhigong jin (志公巾)		Also known as "Zhigong mao" (志公帽). Worn by Buddhist monks during ceremony.	Adult		Ming - Qing	
Hutou mao (虎头帽)		Tiger head hat.	Children		Song - Modern times	
Zhuangyuan mao (状元帽)		Champion hat.	Children		Song - Modern times	
Chixiao mao (鴟鴞帽)		Owl hat.	Children		Song - Modern times	
Xianggong mao (相公帽)		Husband hat.	Children		Song - Modern times	

== Types of headwear for females ==
Headwear of Female
Name		Definition	Description	Suitable age	Match	Period	Images
Ji (笄)		Hairpins.	Single-pronged hairpin. They were often inscribed with auspicious patterns.	Adult		Neolithic – Qin	
Zan (簪)		Ornamental hairpins.	Long, single-pronged hairpin after Qin dynasty. Small ornaments (e.g. flowers) could also be affixed on it	Adult		Han – Qing	
Chai (钗)		U-shaped or V-shaped hairpin.	Two-pronged hairpin.	Adult		Han – Qing	
Chai (钗)		Three-legged hairpin.	Typically made of bronze.			Jin	
Yanbin (掩鬓)			The hairpin covering sideburns.	Adult		Ming – Qing	
Buyao (步摇); "step-sway" or "dangling hairpin" or literally "dangling with one's walking steps".	Buyao Zan (步摇簪)	Buyao hairpin.	Single-pronged hairpin with dangling decorations.	Adult		Han – Qing	
Buyao (步摇); "step-sway" or "dangling hairpin" or literally "dangling with one's walking steps".	Buyao Shu (步摇树)	Buyao Tree.	Tree-shaped dangling decoration centered at front of hair.	Adult		Han – Ming	
Buyao (步摇); "step-sway" or "dangling hairpin" or literally "dangling with one's walking steps".	Buyao Guan (步摇冠)	Buyao Crown.	Crown consisted of dangling decorations.	Adult		Han – Ming	
Zan hua (簪花)		Flower hairpin.	Could be fresh flower, silk flower, and flowers made with other materials. Man could also wear.	Adult		Tang - Qing	
Huasheng (華勝)			Round flower hairpin centered front of hair.	Adult		Han – Song	
Di Guan (翟冠)				Adult		Song - Ming	
Hua Guan (花冠)		Flower Crown.		Adult		Han – Song	
Tang gongzhu touguan (唐公主头冠)		Tang Princess's Crown		Adult		Tang	
Feng Guan (鳳冠)	Huashu Guan (花树冠)	Flower Tree Crown.		Adult		Tang	
Feng Guan (鳳冠)	Feicui Fengguan (翡翠凤冠)	Jade Phoenix Crown.		Adult		Tang	
Feng Guan (鳳冠)	Long Feng Huacha Guan (龙凤花钗冠)	Dragon Phoenix Hairpin Crown.		Adult		Song-Ming	
Feng Guan (鳳冠)	Yanju Guan (燕居冠)			Adult		Ming	
Mo E (抹额)			Piece of garment covering forehead.	Adult		Tang-Qing	
Lianhua mao (莲花帽)		Lotus hat.		Children		Song - Modern time	
Shubi (梳篦) or zhi	Shu (梳)	Comb.				Ancient - Modern	
Shubi (梳篦) or zhi	Bi (篦)	Fine-toothed comb.				Spring and Autumn period - Modern	
Mili (羃䍦)			A hat with a long veil which covered the face and body			Tang dynasty - Tang dynasty	
Weimao (帷帽)			A hat with a hanging veil which covers the face.			Tang dynasty	
Mianyi (面衣) or gaitou (蓋頭)		Veils or "facial clothes".	A purple gauze which hangs on a hat from the front to the back with 4 ribbons of different colours hanging down from on the shoulders. Originated from the Tang dynasty's weimao (帷帽).	Adult		Song dynasty - Unknown	
Humao (胡帽)		"Barbarian hat".	A hat without the veil.			Tang dynasty	
Liangmao (涼帽)		"Cool hat".	A hat worn by the Hakka women, a Han ethnic subgroup when working in the fields. It is made of a flat disc of woven bamboo with a hole in the centre and has a black (or blue) cotton fringe.			Unknown - Present	

== See also ==
- Chinese hairpin
- Hanfu
- Honggaitou
- List of hanfu
- List of hat styles
- List of headgear
- Shubi – Chinese comb
- Tian-tsui
