= Shubi (comb) =

Chinese combs

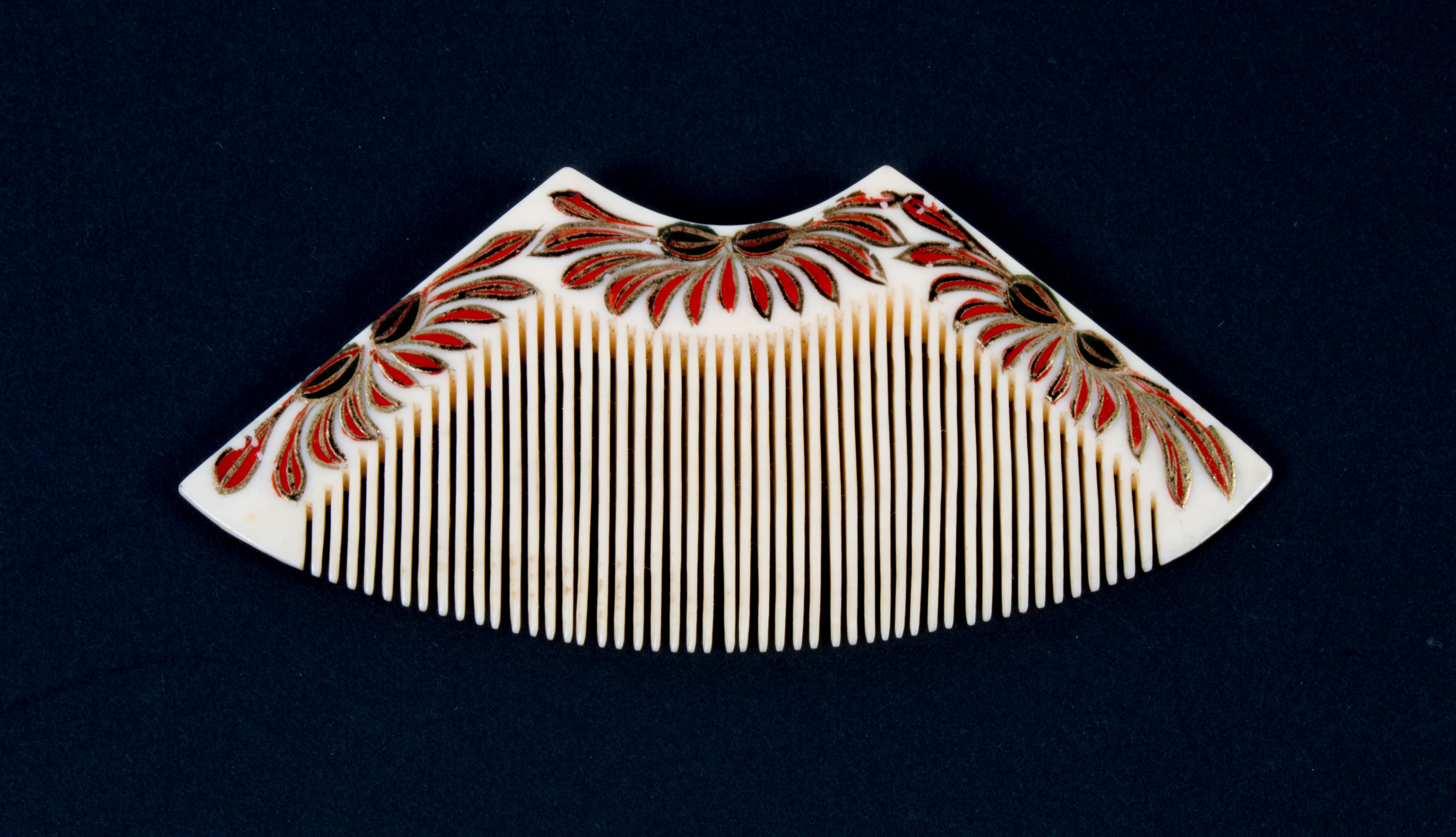
A fine fan shaped ivory comb with red, gold and black hand-painted decoration, gifted to Lady MacDonald in 1898 AD at Peking by the Dowager Empress, Cixi.

Shubi (Chinese: 梳篦), also called as zhi (Chinese: 栉), is a generic term used for Chinese combs in China, which includes thick-teeth comb shu (Chinese: 梳) and thin-teeth comb bi (Chinese: 篦). Shubi originated about 6000 years ago in China during the late Neolithic period. Some Chinese combs dating from the Shang dynasty were found in the Tomb of Fuhao. In ancient China, Chinese combs had a high special status, a high artistic value, was an important form of hair ornament in Chinese history. Chinese comb also had and continues to hold unique cultural meaning and emotional value. Chinese combs in China were not used only for grooming purposes, they were also used holding and decorating hair. Both Chinese men and women wore decorative combs in their hair in ancient China. Chinese women often wore combs and fine-tooth combs in their hair buns. Chinese comb-making was also an important form of traditional Chinese art and business industry.

== Terminology ==
The term shubi (梳篦) also includes to two types of combs: shu (梳); also lit. translated as comb, and sometimes also refer to coarse and thick-teeth comb; and bi (篦; "a type of fine-tooth comb"). The term shubi also refers to a form of hairstyle in ancient China.

The usage of the term zhi (栉) has relatively unstable. The use of the term zhi to refer both types of combs; i.e. thick-tooth combs and fine-teeth combs were only found in the pre-Qin dynasty literature. However, the term zhi was partly changed by the word shu (梳) to refer to thick-tooth comb in the Sui and Tang dynasties. The term zhi was partly changed again by the word bi (篦) to only refer to thin-tooth combs after the Yuan dynasty.

== Origin ==
=== Invention of comb ===
According to a legend, the Chinese comb was invented by one of the concubine of the Yellow Emperor, called Fang Leishi (Chinese: 方雷氏).

=== Invention of Bi ===
The invention of bi, the fine-tooth comb, is attributed to a Spring and Autumn period official called Chen Qizi who was put into prison after being found guilty. In prison, Chen Qizi developed lice on his head which made him itch intolerably. After being tortured by the prison wardens with bamboo planks, Chen Qizi discovered that the bamboo planks would be split into strips; he then packed these wooden strips together to create the original fine-toothed comb to clean his hair from lice and dirt.

=== Foundation of Comb trade ===
According to a legend, after the defeat of Chiyou, the craftsman Hao Lian, who knew how to make combs, was captured, imprisoned and given the death sentence. The prison warden, Huang Fu, discovered that Hao Lian could make combs and advised him to make a comb to save his life overnight. The comb made by Hao Lian was presented to the Queen Luo Zu, but Hao Lian was already executed before an amnesty could be issued. After Hao Lian's death, Emperor Xuan Yuan appointed Huang Fu to lead other craftsmen in comb-making based on the models left behind by Hao Lian. Since this time, Hao Lian and Huang Fu have been both considered as the founders of comb trade.

== Connotation and significance ==
=== Symbolism ===
==== Wedding dowry ====
Chinese combs were also an essential component of dowry in ancient China; they are also a symbolism of a happy life.

==== Pre-wedding ceremony ====
Prenuptial hair-combing ceremony, also known as shang tou (上头), is a traditional Cantonese Chinese ritual which takes place on the eve of the wedding by the couples. It is held at a time which is considered auspicious at the homes of groom and bride respectively to symbolize a rite of passage. This practice is still performed in some ethnic groups in Singapore. It is believed to have been introduced in Singapore by the Cantonese.

==== Taboo ====
Combs in some Chinese nationalities are considered a kind of taboo. For example, for the Tibetans, combs must be hidden in private places; people who wore combs in their hair were perceived as being impolite.

=== Item of special status ===
==== Gift to other leaders ====
In the Han dynasty, Emperor Wendi gave combs to the leader of the Xiongnu, Maodun.

==== Special rights of business ====
Chinese comb-making was an important form of business industry in ancient China. People who were in the business of the selling or the making of combs in China enjoyed special rights in both ancient and modern Chinese industry.

==== Royal status objects ====
Some combs, such as the Changzhou combs, could only be used by members of royalty in ancient China. Nowadays, although the Changzhou combs are commonly used in everyday life, this form of Chinese combs are still considered as national and traditional treasures in China. The city of Changzhou holds a large comb-making business which started operating in the fifth century AD and continues to produce hand-made Chinese combs made of wood; they are now operating as the "Palace Comb Factory" or the "Changzhou Combs Factory".

==== Medical beliefs and practice ====
In Traditional Chinese medicine, hair combing is perceived as an efficient means to remain healthy. In ancient China, Chinese people used shubi to maintain their health due to the doctors' belief that every day hair combing was an important need in traditional medicine. Hair combing is still used for massaging the head to keep oneself healthy in modern China.

== Influences ==
=== Japan ===
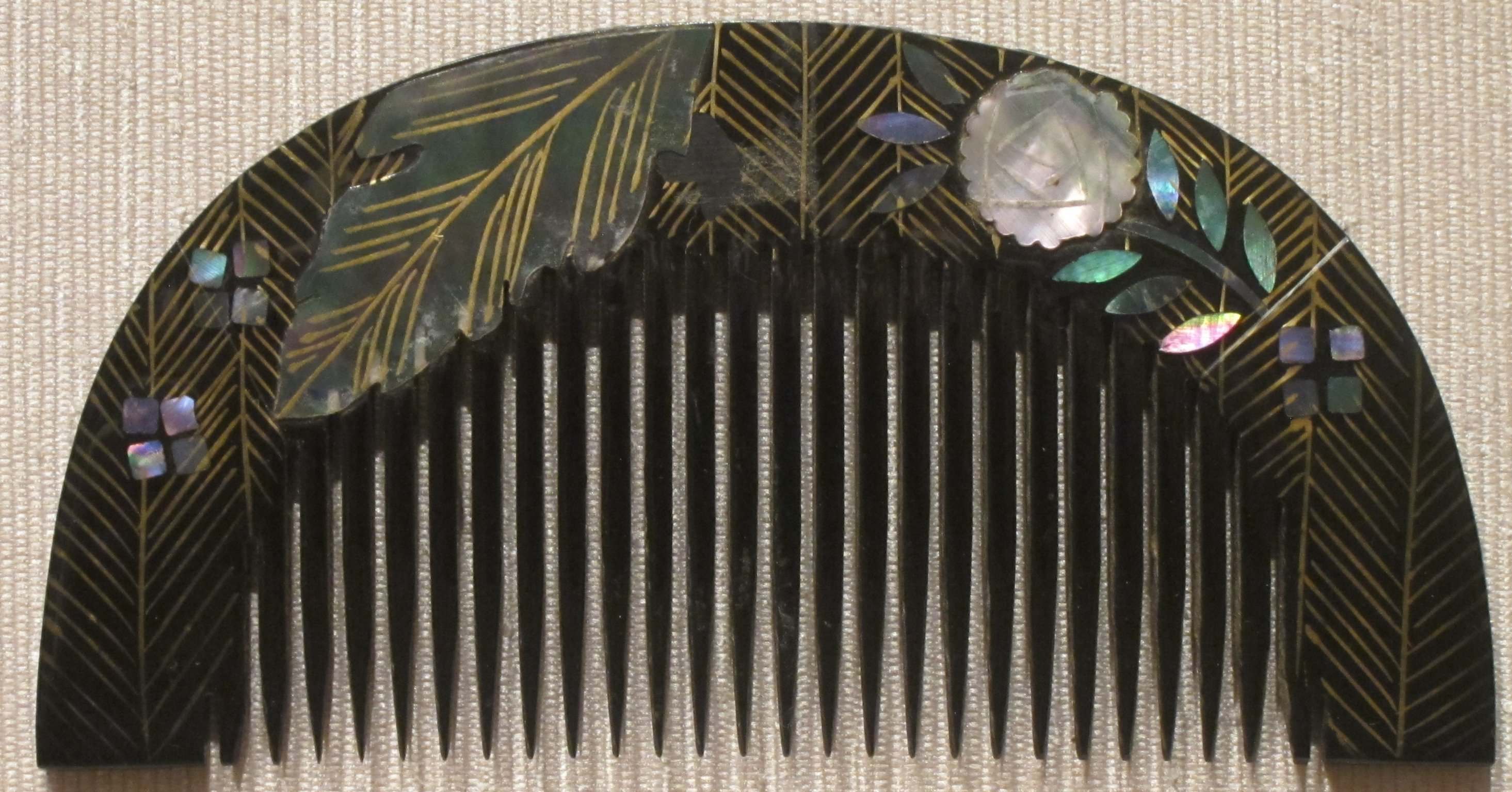
Ornamental Japanese comb, Edo or Taisho period.

Japanese combs, kushi, started to be used by Japanese people 6000 years ago in the Jomon era. Chinese combs were introduced in Japan along with the introduction of Chinese culture during the Nara period. During this period, the Chinese combs which were introduced in Japan were horizontal in shape. The design of the Chinese comb introduced in Nara period was different from stick-shaped hair prongs that had been used by the Japanese before. In Nara period, the Japanese combs, along with Japanese clothes and ornaments, were all influenced by the Sui and Tang dynasty. Some combs continued to be imported from China even in the later centuries, i.e. in the 18th or 19th century AD.

== Gallery ==
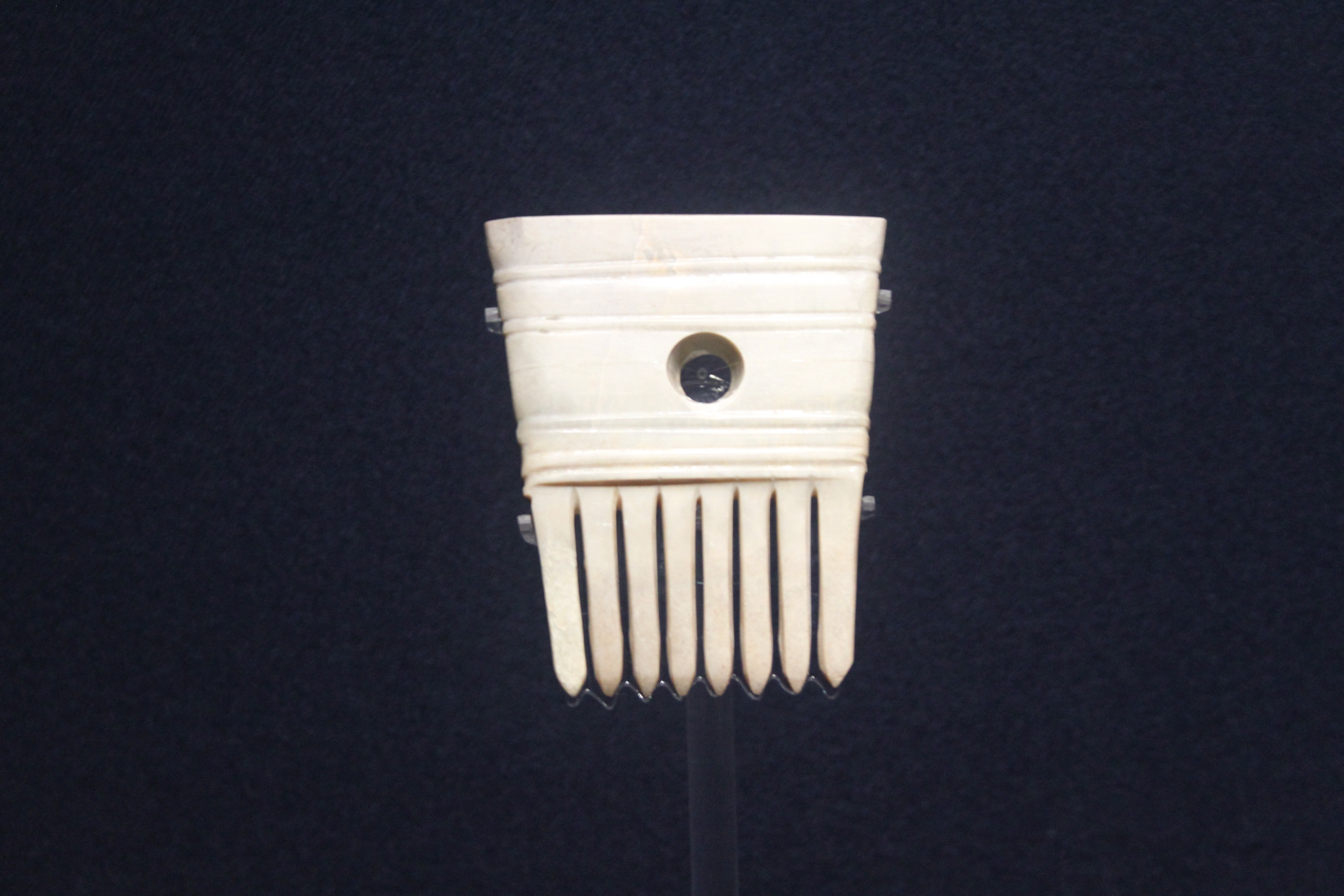
Shang dynasty comb.

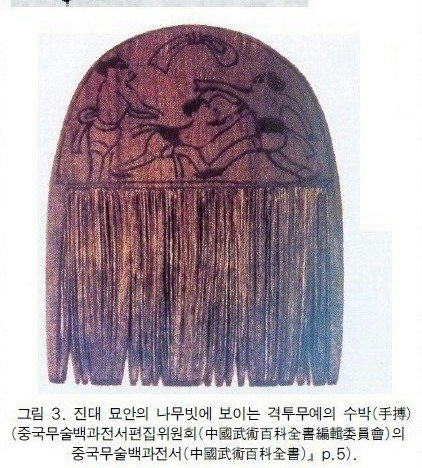
Qin dynasty comb.

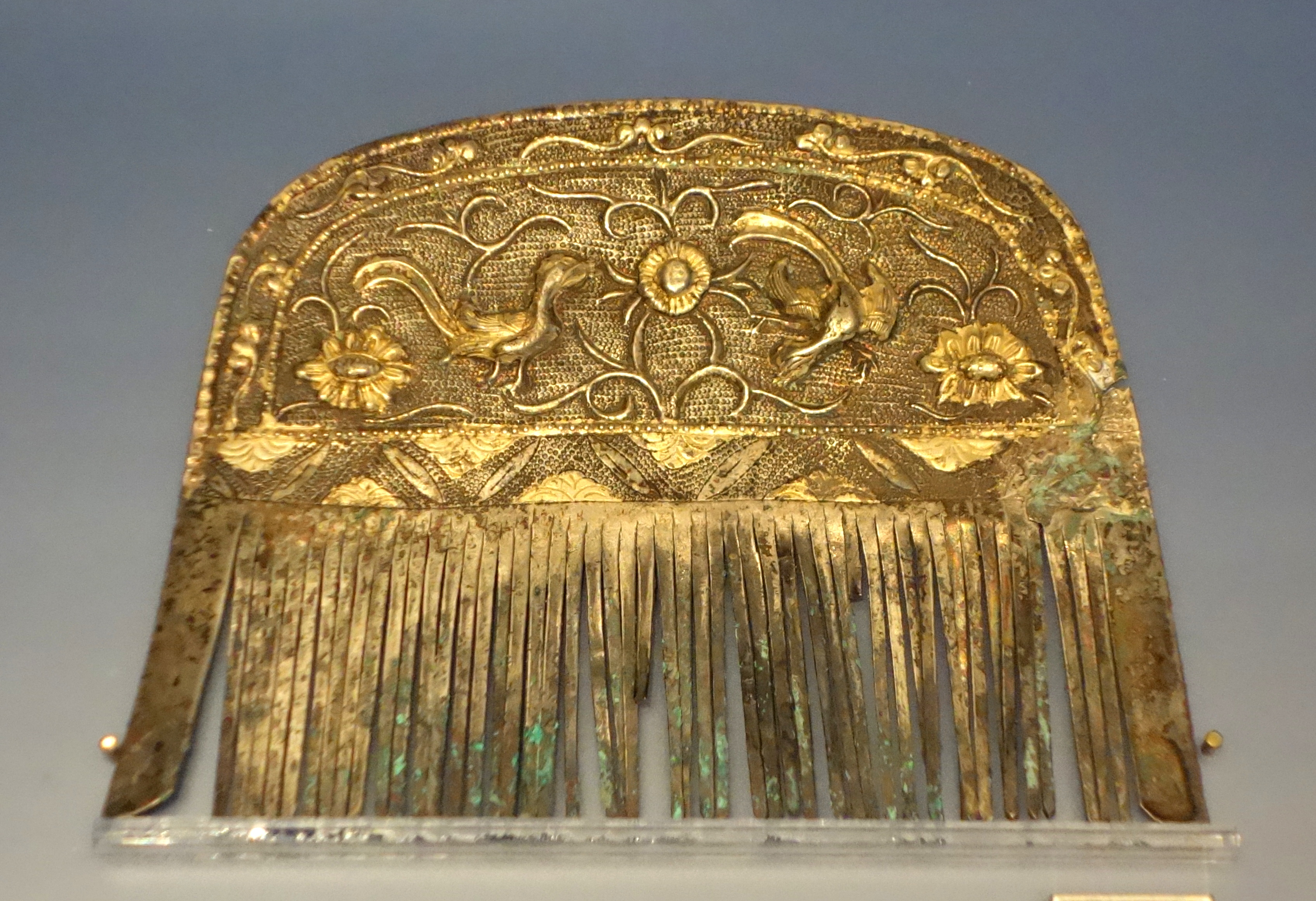
Tang dynasty comb.

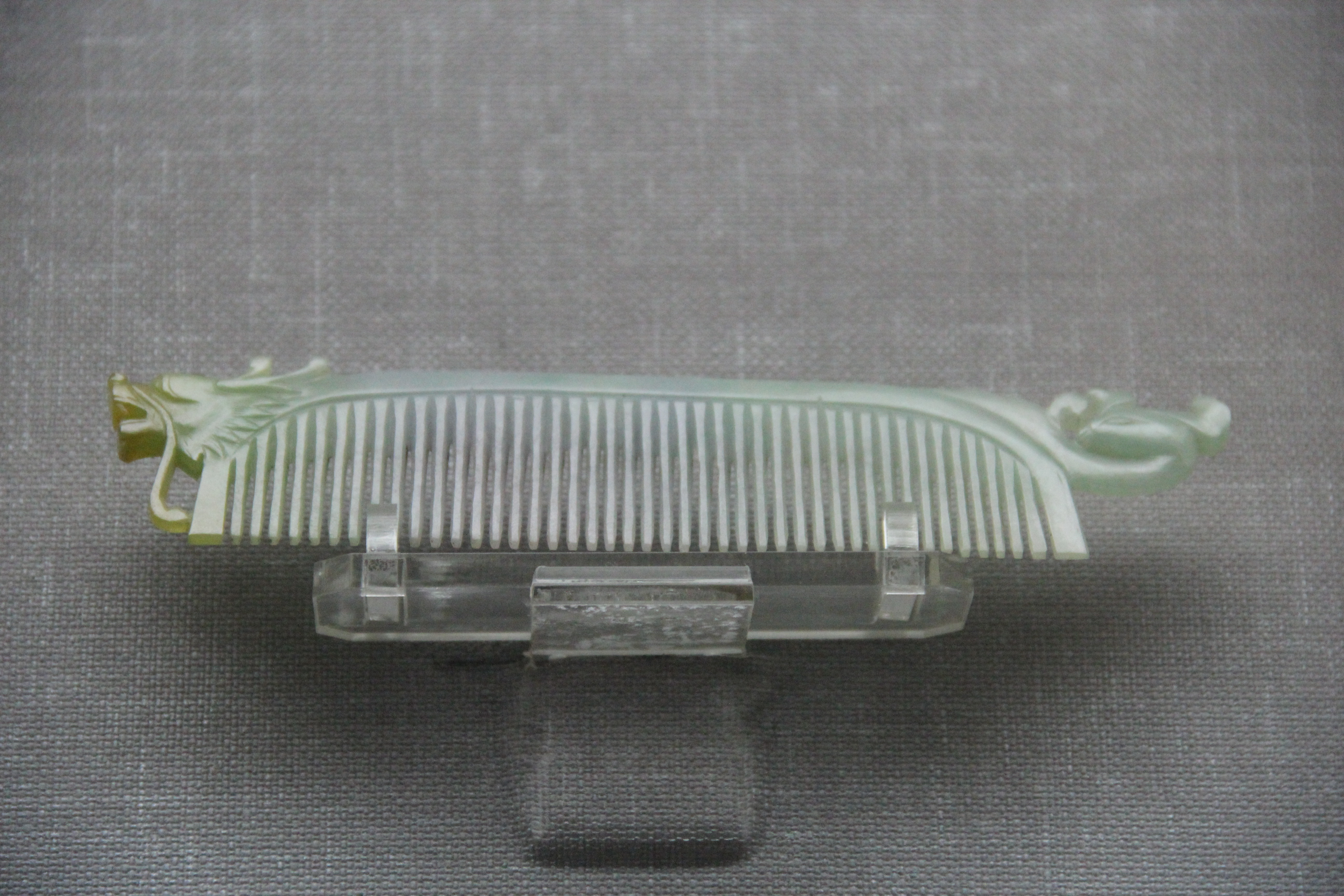
Qing dynasty jade comb

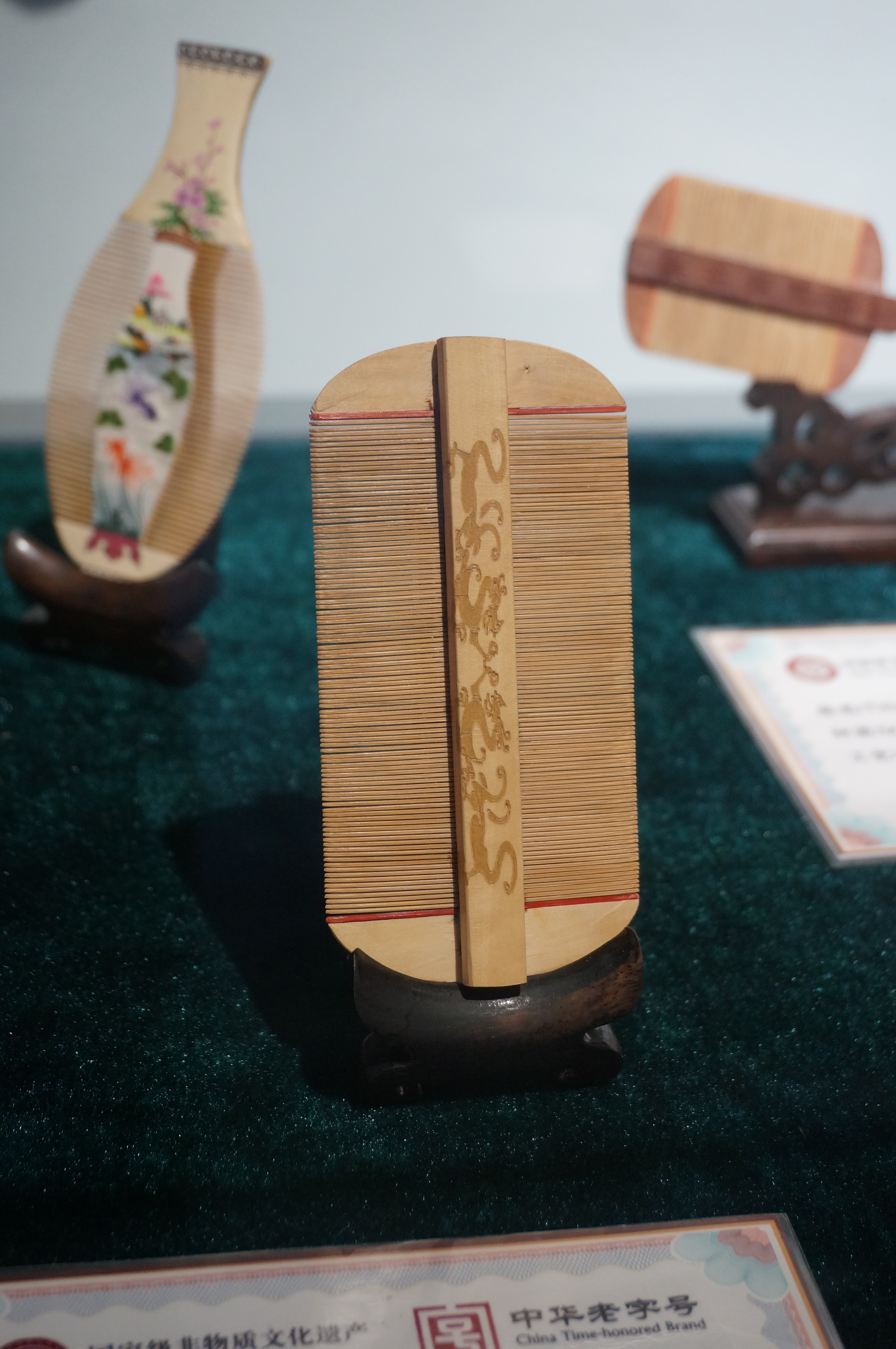
Changzhou comb, double-edged fine-tooth comb.

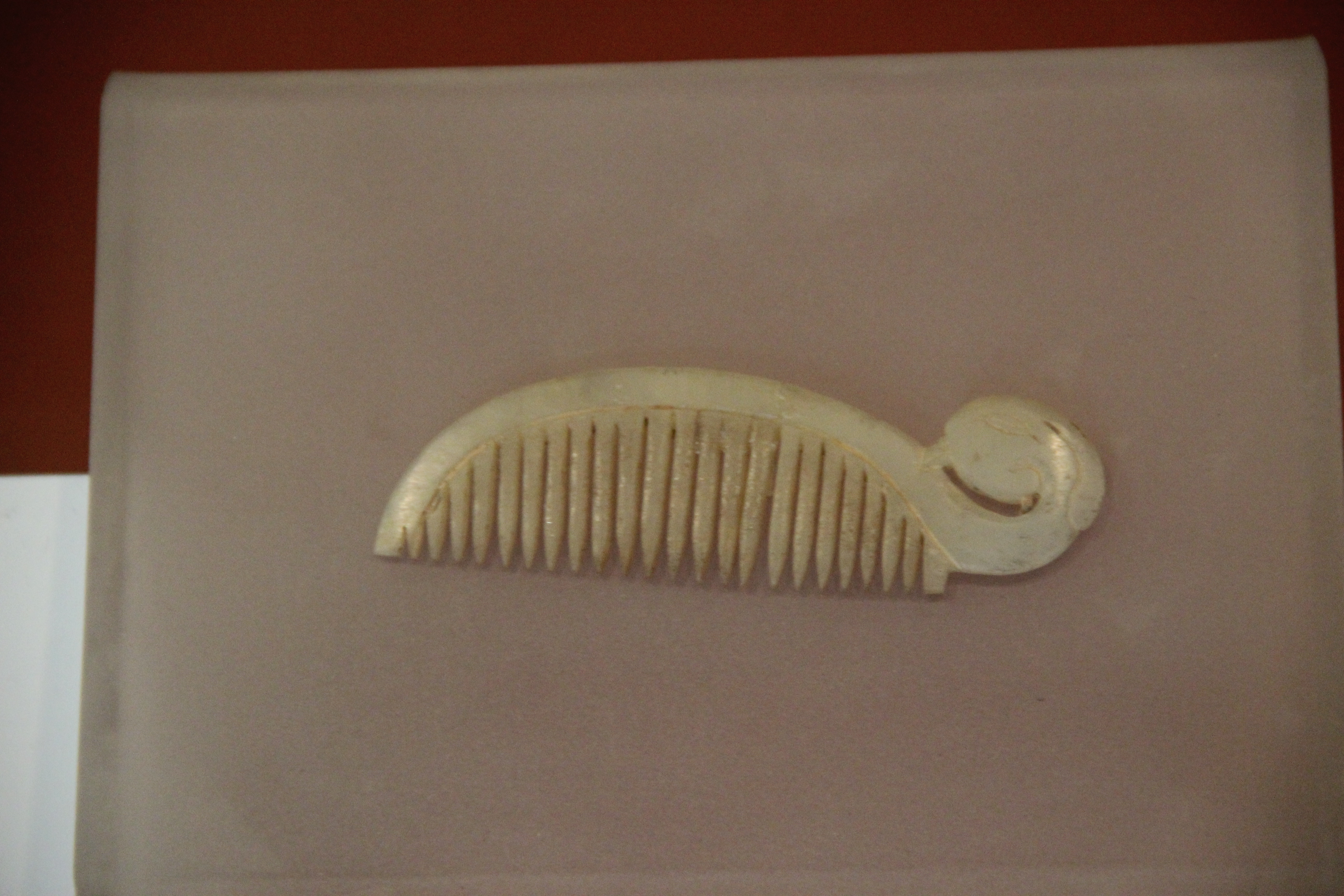
Western Han Jade Comb

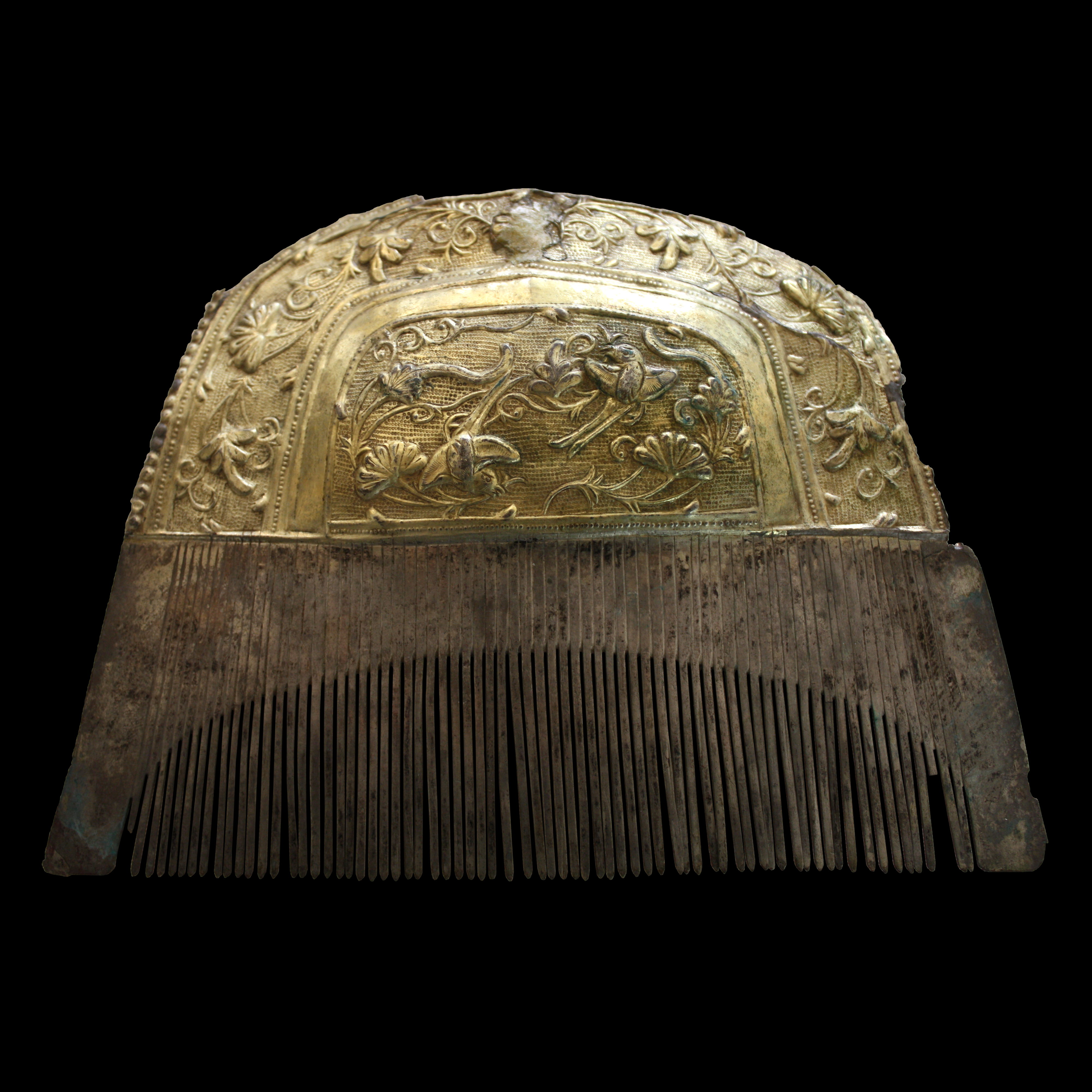
Tang or Liao dynasty silver comb.

== Similar or related items ==
- Changzhou comb
- Kanzashi

== See also ==
- Buyao
- Chinese hairpin
- List of Hanfu headwear
- Hanfu accessories
