= Honggaitou =

Red veil used in Chinese wedding

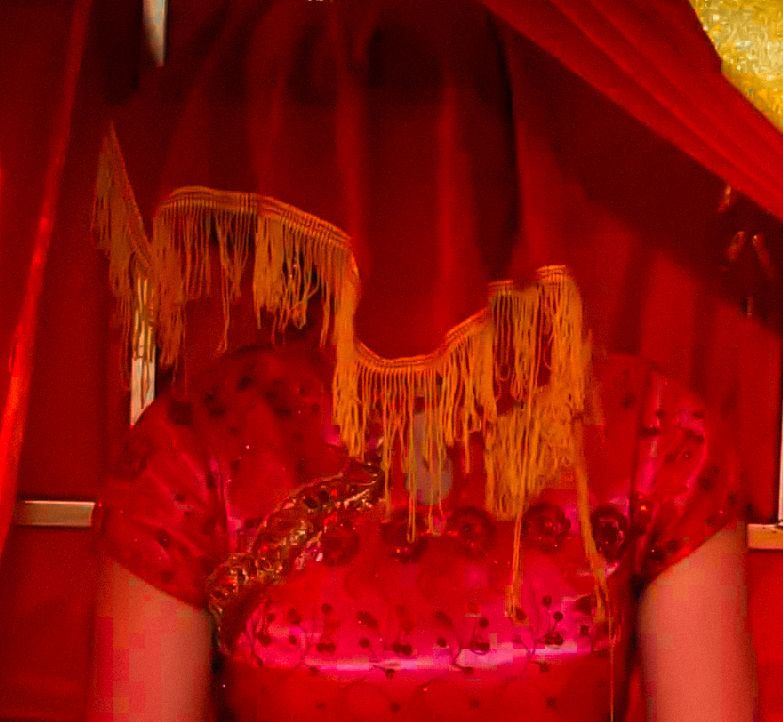
- A Chinese bride wearing honggaitou to cover her face and a red wedding cheongsam.

Chinese name
- Chinese: 紅蓋頭
- Literal meaning: Red cover head
Transcriptions
Standard Mandarin
- Hanyu Pinyin: Hónggàitou

English name
- English: Red veil

A honggaitou (Chinese: 紅蓋頭; pinyin: hónggàitou), also shortened to gaitou (Chinese: 蓋頭; pinyin: gàitou; lit. 'head cover') and referred to as red veil in English, is a traditional red-coloured bridal veil worn by the Han Chinese brides to cover their faces on their wedding ceremony before their wedding night. The honggaitou is worn along with a red wedding dress. (Note: The use of the honggaitou is not compulsory in traditional Chinese wedding as many other headwear were also used, such as the fengguan.) Veils have been used in China since the Han dynasty. The custom of wearing the honggaitou for wedding ceremonies can be traced back to the Song dynasty period. The custom of wearing the honggaitou, along with the traditional red wedding dress, continues to be practiced in modern-day China. However, under the influence of Western culture and globalization, most Chinese brides nowadays wear white wedding dresses and a white veil, an imitation of Western Christian weddings, instead of the red wedding dresses and honggaitou.

== Cultural significance and symbolism ==
In Chinese culture, the colour red (Chinese: 紅; pinyin: hóng) symbolizes good luck, happiness, joy, and celebration. The colour white, which is used in Western Christian weddings, symbolizes death in Chinese culture rather than holiness and purity. The colour white used to be avoided in Chinese weddings in the past.

=== Cultural practice ===
According to tradition, the groom would fetch his bride at her home in a palanquin on the morning of their wedding day. Before the arrival of the groom, the bride would place the honggaitou over her head to cover her face. When they arrived at the groom's home, they would perform the wedding ceremonies and rituals (including the Heaven and Earth worship, etc.). When the bride was brought to the wedding room, but just before entering the room, the groom would use a stick to remove her honggaitou and throw it on the roof while never looking at her face. It was only after the bride entered the room and returned for the shangbai (Note: Shangbai means "paying respects to the senior generation". It is a ritual wherein the bride will be introduced to the groom's senior relatives.) that the groom and the wedding guests would see her face for the first time.

== History ==
During the Song dynasty, Chinese women from the middle and upper classes wore the honggaitou at their wedding ceremonies.

== Construction and design ==
The honggaitou is a square of red fabric.

== See also ==
- Cheongsam
- Fengguan – Phoenix coronet
- Hanfu
- Hanfu headgear
- Mili (veil)
- Qungua
- Veil
