= Liangmao =

Traditional Hakka hat

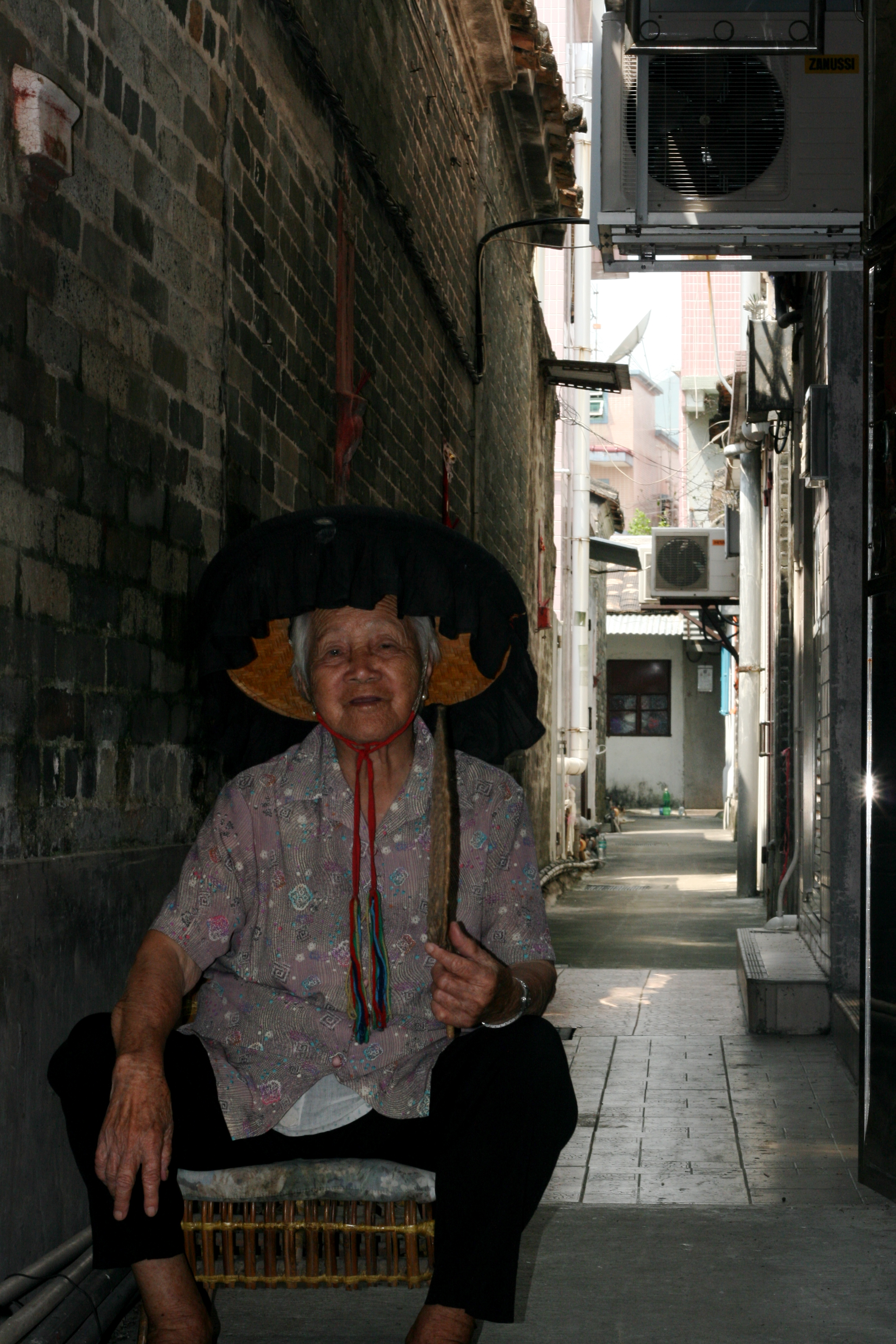
- A Hakka woman wearing the traditional Hakka hat, called Liangmao.

Chinese name
- Chinese: 涼帽
- Literal meaning: Cool hat
Transcriptions
Standard Mandarin
- Hanyu Pinyin: Liángmào

English name
- English: Cool hat/ Hakka hat/ Hakka bamboo hat

Liangmao (Chinese: 涼帽; lit. 'cool hat'), also known as Hakka hat and Hakka bamboo hat, is a traditional bamboo and/or straw hat worn by the Hakka people who perform manual work, such as farming and fishing. Hakka women wore it when working in the fields. The liangmao is made and is most commonly worn by the Hakka people who were originally from Northern China. The liangmao is a typical symbol of Hakka culture and is a "unique feature of Hakka culture"; it is also the "most public symbol associated with the Hakka". Some Hakka women still wear the liangmao when working outdoors nowadays. It also worn by non-Hakka women who work outdoors.

== History ==
=== Popularity and decline ===
Gankeng town is the home of Liangmao village. The people of Gankeng have been making liangmao for more than 200 years. After the founding of the People's Republic of China in 1949, Gankeng town was the biggest producer of liangmao. In the 1970s and 1980s, every household in Liangmao Village would produce liangmao which would then be exported to Southeast Asia, Britain, and France. In the late 1970s, the liangmao lost its market appeal and the demand for the hat shrank. In 2002, the last Hakka hat maker died; and no more residents of Gankeng town made the hats anymore.

=== Intangible cultural heritage ===
- In 2006, the Gankeng bamboo hat was included on the Shenzhen Municipal Intangible Cultural Heritage list.
- In 2013, the Hakka hat-making craft was added to the Guangdong's provincial intangible cultural heritage list.

=== Cultural inheritors ===
- Zhang Guanxian and Zhang Hangyan, who are both veterans liangmao craftsmen, were named as the inheritors of the Hakka liangmao.

=== Monuments ===
- Liangmao Baby - a statue of an ethnic Hakka girl wearing liangmao was erected on 29 September 2016 in Gankeng New Town, Longgang district of Shenzhen, Guangdong province, as a new municipal mascot.

== Construction and design ==
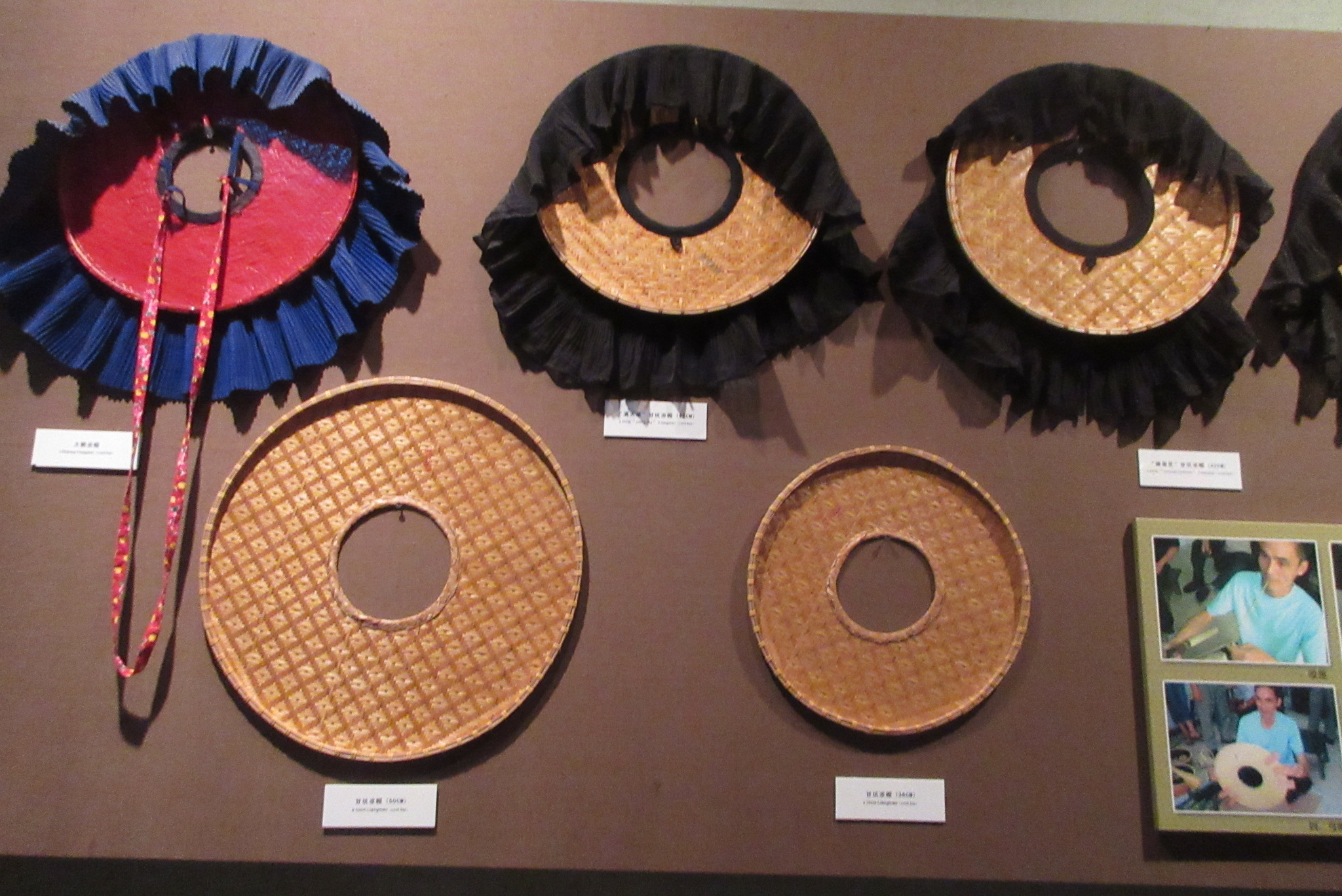
Liangmao, lit. 'cool hat', now stored in Shenzhen Museum.

The design of the liangmao reflects its functions as a hat designed for farming and fishing:

- The liangmao is made of a flat disc of woven bamboo and/or straw.
- There is a hole in the centre of the hat which is trimmed with black embroidered cotton. The lack of crown on top of the hat allows the head to remain cool.
- Around the outside edge of the hat, there is a fringe or veil of black (sometimes blue) pleated cotton fabric hanging down. The cotton fringe around the edge of the hat is about 15 cm deep. The cotton fringe covers the shoulders and give protection from insects. It also keep the sun off from the face of its wearer, and in winter, the cotton fringe would offer some warmth.
- In summer, the cotton cloth could be removed, and the hat would be secured by attaching ties through the loops that were attached to the central hole.

== See also ==
- Hanfu
- Hakka
- Hanfu headgear
- Weimao
- Conical hat
