= Changzhou comb =

Chinese comb produced in Changzhou

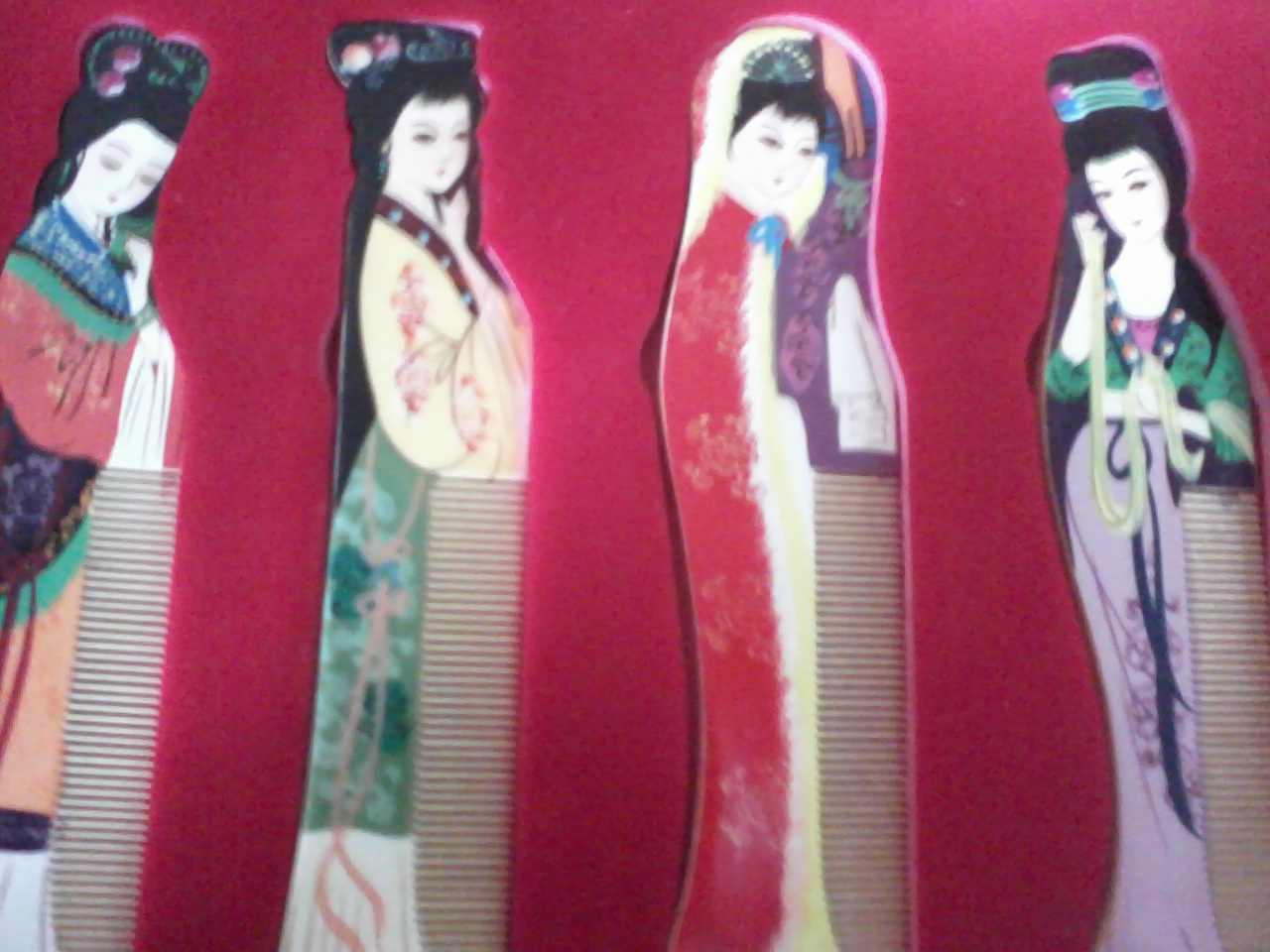
Changzhou combs representing the Four Beauties of China

The Changzhou comb (Chinese: 常州梳篦; pinyin: Chángzhōu shūbì) is a type of hand-painted comb produced in Changzhou, Jiangsu, China. In China, combs are called shubi (梳篦). The combs were originally made for use by royalty and have been in production for over 2000 years.

== Introduction ==
Comb is two kinds of utensils, namely wooden comb. Changzhou comb production technology was formed during the Eastern Jin dynasty and has a history of more than 1,500 years.

During the Ming and Qing dynasties, the production process of Changzhou comb has reached a very high level, and the production scale also exceeded the previous generations. The "Changzhou Fu" during the Qianlong period of the Qing dynasty stated: "Cut bamboo into, and all households in Chaojingmen." At that time, tens of thousands of people in Ximen and Nanmen of Changzhou were engaged in combing making, so Ximen had "Guiji Lane", South Gate has "Mushu Street" as a place name. In the beginning of Guangxu period of the Qing dynasty, officials from the Suzhou Weaving House went to Changzhou every year to order a batch of fine combs, which were sent to the palace of the capital as imperial items.

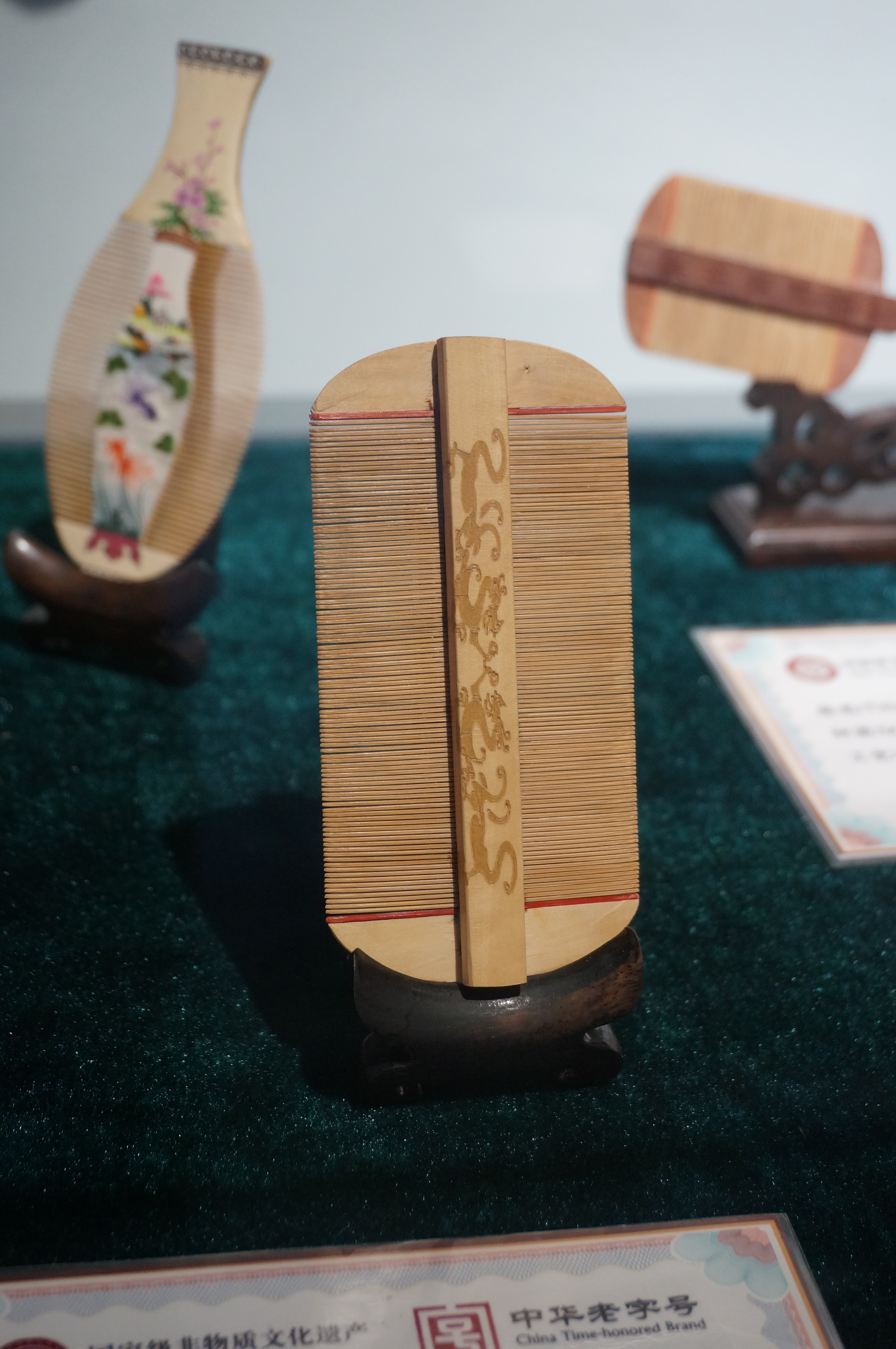
Double edged Comb in the museum

== Development ==
In the past, the main unit of shop was household-side households scattered on the outskirts of the city. It seems to have been using the relatively primitive family life community as the basic unit of social production. With hereditary craftsmanship, the system characteristics of Changzhou comb grate industry with scattered and numerous grassroots are formed. These decentralized production methods are actually not conducive to process improvement and production efficiency. The lack of technical communication and cooperation leads to uneven product quality. It is not conducive to the development of the grate industry in Changzhou.

Because of the reform and opening up, Changzhou comb industry has gradually formed a centralized comb manufacturer with Changzhou comb manufacturing factory as the center. The skillful folk craftsmen also gained the opportunity to show their talents.

== History ==
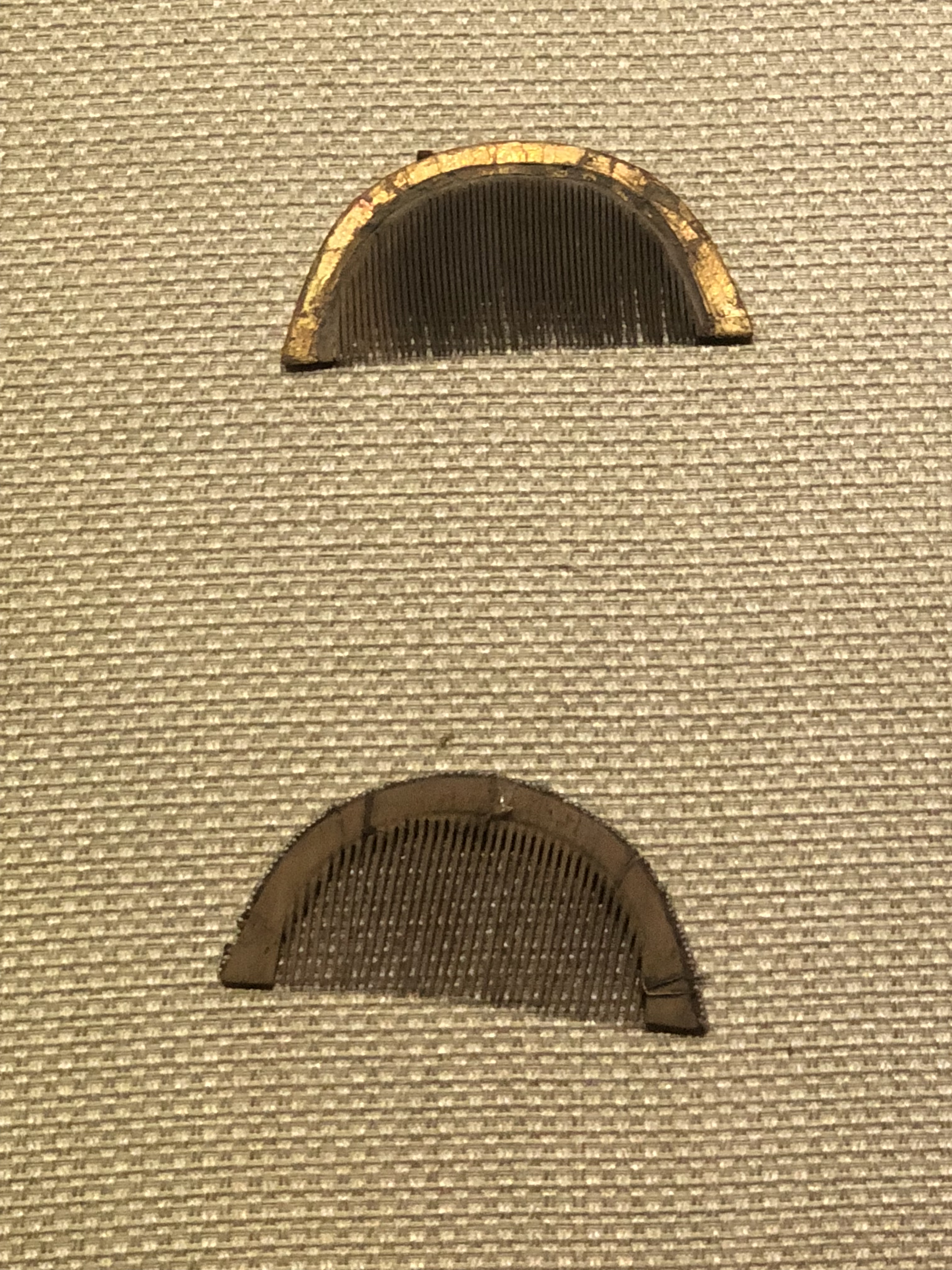
Halfmoon Wooden Comb. Southern Song dynasty.

Production of hand-painted combs in Changzhou dates from the Eastern Zhou (770-221 BCE) (Chinese: 东周, also called The Transitional Period, Chinese: 春秋战国), the first master was Chen Qizi (Chinese: 陈七子). The hand-painted combs of Changzhou have been popular since the time of the Southern and Northern dynasties. During the Qing dynasty, local officials would send the finest combs to the palace. An ivory comb made in Changzhou is still displayed in the Forbidden City.

== Manufacturing processes ==
Production of Changzhou combs requires special skills and use of dedicated materials. The materials for combs can be bamboo, wood or animal bones. The bamboo is mainly from the south from Jiangsu and the west of Zhejiang. The wood mainly stems from valuable types, such as mahogany wood, jujube wood, heather and boxwood. The production process of a wooden comb (Chinese: 梳) contains 28 steps and a Bi (Chinese: 篦, a different type of comb, which has more teeth) requires 72 processes. The production of combs is very specific about the carving, painting, heating, engraving, grinding and other processes that are used, and which require traditional crafts. Since Changzhou comb is made with natural materials, they are often used for decorative purposes, while the use is also said to be good for the hair.

== Honors ==
Changzhou combs have also won many awards. They were first exhibited outside China at the Panama–Pacific International Exposition in 1915, where a Silver Award was received. In the following decades, several prizes were won inside and outside China. Changzhou combs were also presented as gifts of Shanghai World Expo to visitors.

In 1926, commemorating the 150th anniversary of the independence of the United States of America, an international exposition was held in Philadelphia, and Changzhou Comb was awarded the gold medal.

- The Southern Seas Industries Association (Chinese: 南洋劝业会) (1910): Gold Medal
- Panama–Pacific International Exposition (1915): Silver Medal
- The Philadelphia Exposition (1926): Gold Medal
- The national light industrial export exhibition (1988): Silver Medal
- Beijing International Exposition (1991): Gold Medal

== See also ==
- Shubi (comb)
- Chinese hairpin
