= Buyao =

Chinese hairpin with dangling ornaments

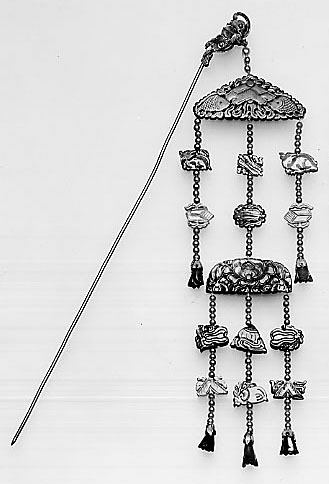
- Buyao, China, 18th century

Chinese name
- Traditional Chinese: 步搖
- Simplified Chinese: 步摇
- Literal meaning: Step-shake
Transcriptions
Standard Mandarin
- Hanyu Pinyin: Bùyáo

English name
- English: Buyao/ buyao hairpin

Buyao (simplified Chinese: 步摇; traditional Chinese: 步搖; pinyin: Bùyáo; lit. 'step-shake') is a type of Chinese women's hair ornament. It is a type of Chinese hairpin which was oftentimes decorated with carved designs and jewelries that dangle when the wearer walks, hence the name, which literally means "shake as you go". The buyao is similar to a zan hairpin, except for the presence of its dangling ornaments, which are its primary featured characteristics. The buyao appeared as early as in the Han dynasty, where only noble women in the royal family could wear it. In ancient times, the use of buyao denoted noble status. Some noble women also put buyaos on their tiaras, making their hair decoration more luxurious than simple buyao. Common material used in making the buyao was gold; the ornaments were typically jade and pearls. Other valuable materials could be used, such as silver, agate, etc. Many centuries after the fall of the Han dynasty, the buyao was introduced to ordinary civilians; and when all women were allowed to wear it, more variety of materials were used to produce them. Buyao was passed down over generations; buyao decorated with pendants are still popular in modern-day China.

== History ==
The wearing of buyao were fashionable during the Han, Wei, Jin, Northern and Southern dynasties. During this period, there were two types of buyao: the buyao flower and the buyao crown (步摇冠; Bùyáoguān). The buyao flower was more prevailing in the Central plains and in the Southern dynasties and was worn by women only whereas the buyao crown was worn by both men and women in the Yan and Dai regions, which were the location where the ancient Xianbei resided. These two forms of buyao were influenced by the gold crown culture of the nomadic tribes who lived in the grasslands of Central Asia however, the cultural differences between the Central plains and the Yan-Dai areas contributed in the difference in shapes, wearing fashion, aesthetics preferences and meaning of historical culture, etc.

=== Han dynasty ===
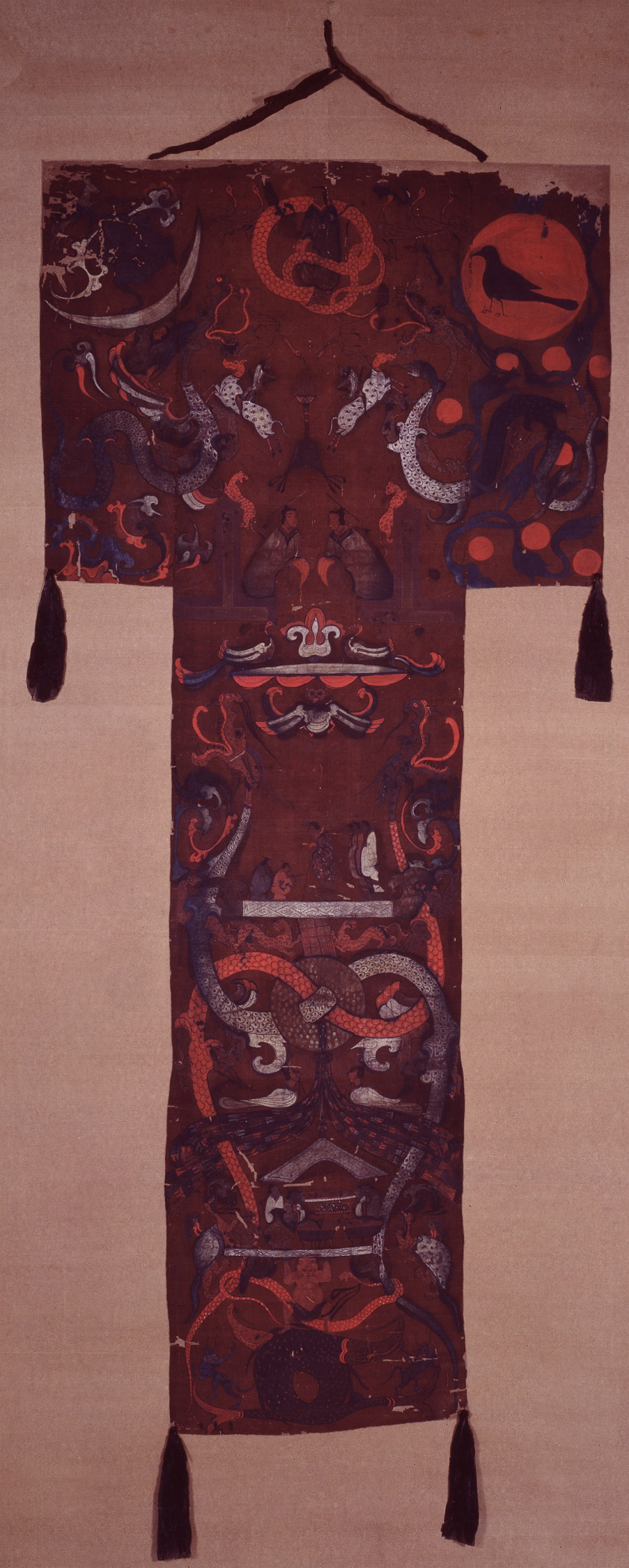
Mawangdui silk banner from tomb no1, Han dynasty.

During the Western Han period, buyaos were created and adopted the style of the Western region's accessories, and became popular. The earliest depiction of buyao so far can be found on the Mawangdui tomb funeral banner which shows Lady Dai wearing a buyao which was painting in the Western Han dynasty.

In ancient Chinese texts, the buyao is largely defined in terms of their structure. For examples, according to the Shiming in the section Shi toushi (釋頭飾), it is written that:

步搖，上有垂珠，步則搖 也

The top of a buyao has hanging beads, and when one takes a step, they sway.

The Hanshu mention the buyao guan worn by an official in the Jiang Chong zhuan (江充傳; 'Biography of Jiang Chong'):

充衣紗縠襌衣, 曲裾後垂交輸，冠禪纚步搖冠，飛翮之纓

Chong wore gauzy diaphanous robe, and the overlapping curved panels of his robes hung down in back. He wore on his head a sheer head covering and a buyao cap [also known as buyao crown], and fluttering feather tassels.

During this period, the buyao was not only worn by the Han Chinese but also by the Wuhuan women who would grow their hair long, divide it into buns and decorate their hair with hairpins and buyao. The buyao were worn also by the Han dynasty empresses; according to the Yufu zhi (輿服誌) of the Hou Han shu:

皇后謁廟服，紺上皁下，蠶，青上縹下，皆深衣制，隱領袖緣以絛。首飾有假結、步搖、簪、珥。步搖以黃金為山題，貫白珠為桂枝相繆，一爵九華，熊、虎、赤羆、天鹿、避邪、南山豐大特六獸

When empresses dressed to visit the ancestral shrine, they wore dark purple on the top and black on the bottom, silkworms, and greenish black on the top and pure white on the bottom. The dress code was all dark clothing, and silk ribbons were used to hide the edges of the collar and sleeves. [They wore] fake chignons, buyao, hairpins, and ear ornaments. Their buyao used gold for the mountain-shaped frontal piece, and white pearls were strung on the intertwining cassia branches. [They wore] a sparrow and nine flowers, and the six beasts: the bear, tiger, red bear, heavenly deer, bixie, and the grand cow from Nanshan.

At the time of the Eastern Han dynasty, the buyao was introduced to Japan.

=== Wei, Jin, Northern and Southern dynasties ===
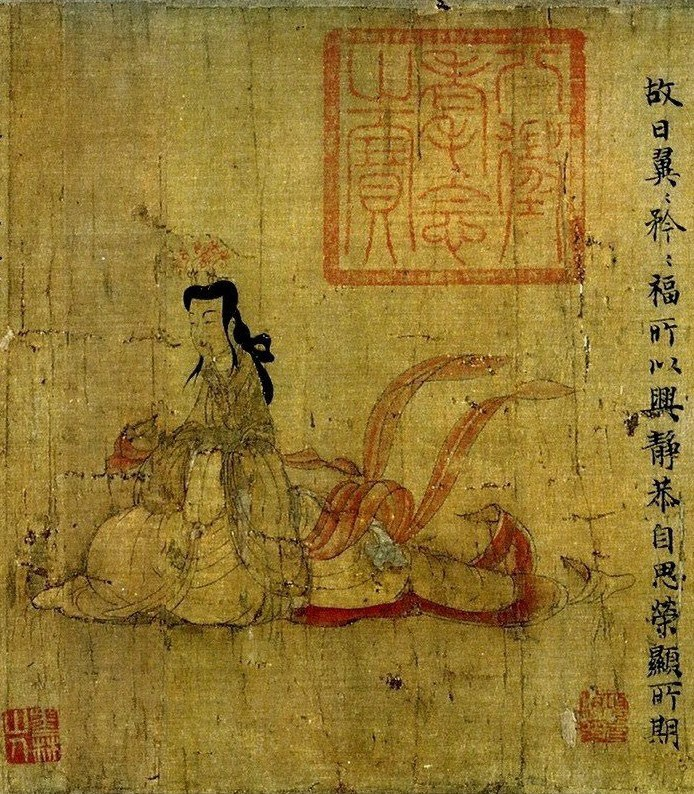
A woman wearing buyao crown painted in Admonitions Scroll Scene 11.

According to the Yufu zhi (輿服誌), the Jin shu also mentioned that the palace ladies from Western Han through Jin wore buyao in their hair as hair ornaments. Buyao are depicted in the Admonitions Scroll attributed to Gu Kaizhi as a pair of zan (簪), a type of Chinese hairpin, decorated with delicate ornaments which are shaped like birds and sits on delicate branches which extend out like blooming flowers and when the wearer would walk, the thin branches would move slightly causing any hairpin ornaments or beads to shake. The buyao worn by the court ladies in the Admonitions Scroll might have been variants or lower-ranking variants of those worn by the empresses.

Buyao made of gold appear to be representative head ornaments of the early elite culture of the Murong Xianbei. The Murong, similarly to the people of Buyeo, wore gold ornaments which had dangling leaves called Bùyáoguān (步摇冠; 'buyao crown'); they looked like golden-leaf and tree-like head ornaments and were worn by both men and women; they were however different from the Chinese buyao which were only worn by women.

According to the Murong Hui zaiji (慕容廆載記; 'Chronicles of Murong Hui') of the Jin Shu, Mohuba, the Murong Xianbei leader, introduced the buyao ornaments to his people by copying it from the Chinese. Initially, the Murong clan lived in the Liaodong regions, but during the Cao Wei dynasty, they migrated to the Liaoxi regions. When Mohuba saw the people of Yan and Dai wearing the buyao guan, he ordered all his people to tie their hair and wear the buyao guan. The buyao crown largely disappeared when the Tuoba Xianbei conquered Northern China.

=== Tang dynasty ===
In the Tang dynasty, golden buyao which were decorated with flowers and birds were favoured by the Empresses. The Tang dynasty empresses would attach their buyao to their ceremonial wig. Buyao were also worn by the Tang dynasty upper-class women.

== Types and designs ==
Dragons and phoenix designs were typically used to decorate the buyao Other shapes and decorations included:

- Bixie design – a symbol to ward off ill luck and maintain happiness,
- Birds, and other winged animals;
- Butterfly,
- Flowers,
- Tassels and pendants, and
- Valuable gemstones.
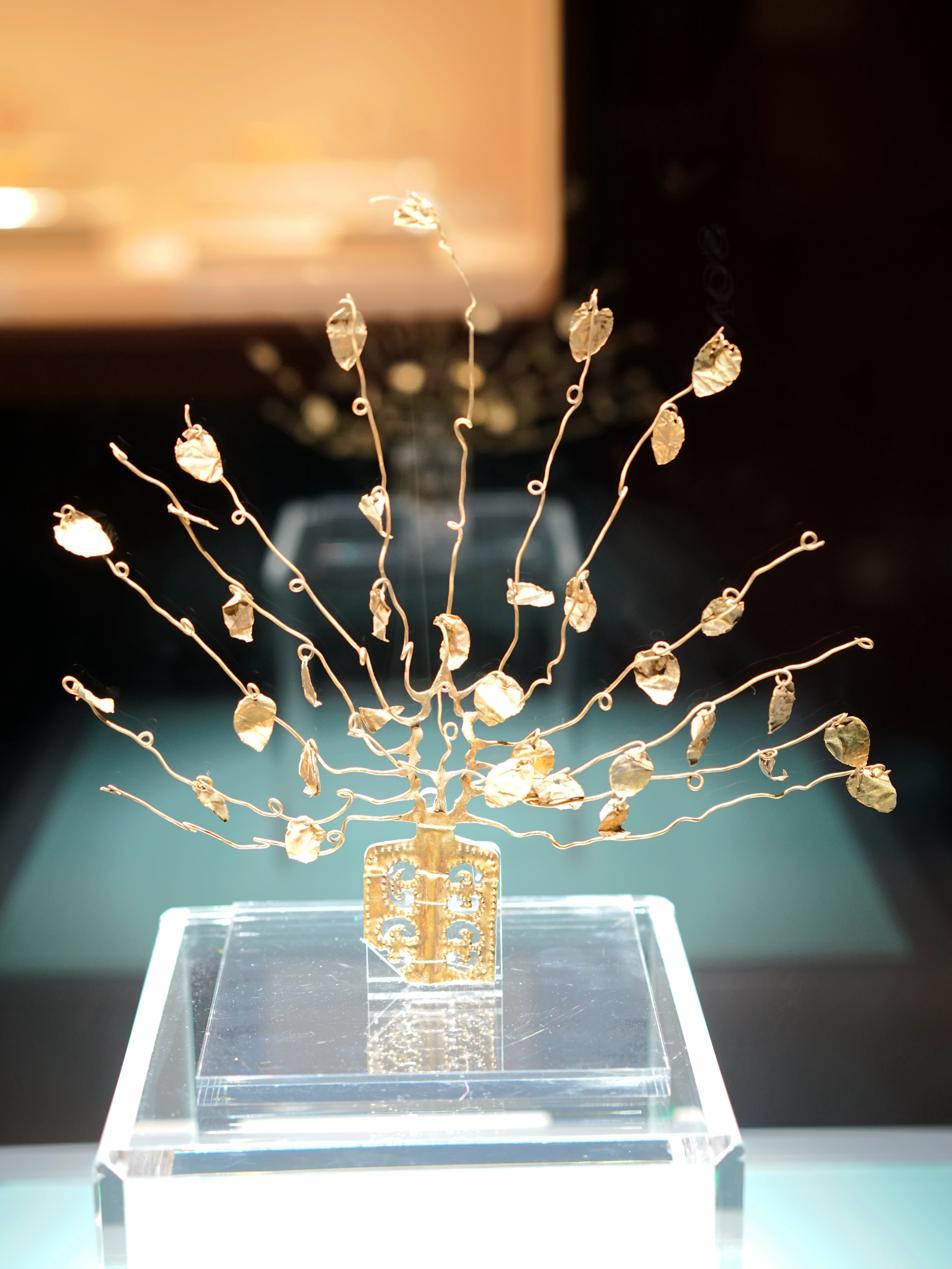
Tree-shaped gold shimmering buyao crown (buyao guan) of Jin dynasty (266–420).

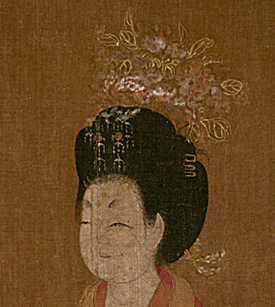
Tang Court Lady wearing flower buyao crown

== See also ==
- Fengguan - Phoenix crown
- Shubi - Chinese comb
- Hanfu accessories
