= Fanglei =

Legendary Chinese empress

Feng Leishi (Chinese: 方雷氏) was a legendary Chinese empress, the second wife of the Yellow Emperor. According to tradition, she invented the comb in the 27th century BC.

== Legend ==
In the ancient times of Huaxia, Fang Leishi was the eldest daughter of Yu Gong, Shennong's eighth grandson. After Huangdi defeated Yandi Yu Gong and seized the rule of the Yanhuang tribal alliance in the Central Plains, he married Fang Leishi. The marriage of the two clan groups, Yan and Huang, constituted the core of the Huaxia clan and created a shared history of more than three thousand years.

Fang Leishi became the second consort of the Yellow Emperor. She was the mother of Xuan Xiao, the eldest son who created the Phoenix Totem of the Huaxia clan. She was a noble, elegant, kind and wise princess. At that time, when mankind had just passed through the primitive and savage century and entered the era of ancient civilization.

There were more than 20 women in Fang Leishi's palace who often had unkempt hair. In order to participate in the grand ceremonies of the time, these women used their fingers to smooth their shaggy hair, often hurting their fingers.

One year, the Yellow River flooded; Dihuo, who invented boats for the Yellow Emperor, caught 19 big fish in the flooded river and took them to the palace. Fang Leishi and the others cooked the big fish on hot stone slabs over firewood. Dihuo ate three of the fish in one breath, and the bones piled up on the ground. Fang Leishi picked one up, bent it, and could not help looking at it. She unconsciously combed her hair with the fish bones and unintentionally neatly combed her long hair. She herself did not know why her unkempt long hair was combed smoothly with fish bones. Fang Leishi thought about it, and secretly stored these big fish bones.

The next day, she broke the fish bones into short sections and called the women of the palace to her and gave a section to each, teaching them how to comb their hair. They all began to comb their hair with fish bones.
