= Gwanbok =

Official clothing in historical Korea

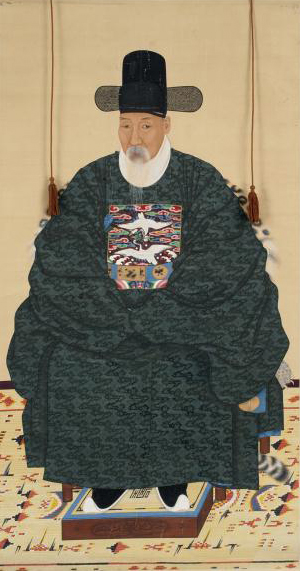
- Heuk dallyeongpo in the late 18th century

Korean name
- Hangul: 관복
- Hanja: 官服, 冠服
- RR: gwanbok
- MR: kwanbok

Gwanbok (Korean pronunciation: [kwanbok̚]) is a Sino-Korean term derived from the terms guanfu (Chinese: 冠服; lit. 'guan and clothing'; Korean: 관복; Hanja: 冠服; RR: gwanbok; lit. 'gwan and clothing') and guanfu (Chinese: 官服; pinyin: guānfú; lit. 'official's clothing'; Korean: 관복; Hanja: 官服; RR: gwanbok). The term gwanbok (관복; 冠服) is a collective term which refers to historical official attire, which was bestowed by the government court, including Chinese courts of various dynasties. The guanfu (冠服) system was a court attire system in China which also formed part of the Hanfu (simplified Chinese: 汉服; traditional Chinese: 漢服; pinyin: Hànfú; lit. 'Han Chinese clothing') system. This system was them spread to neighbouring countries and was adopted in Korea since ancient times in different periods through the ritual practice of bestowal of clothing. Acknowledgement through bestowed robes and crowns (冠服) from the Emperor of China, who held hegemony over East Asia, would give support to Korean Kings and successors, as being the authentic rulers of their country as well as confirmed the political status of the Korean kingdom in the rest of the Sinosphere. The gwanbok system in Korea was different for each kingdom and changed throughout different periods. For example, initially given by the Chinese court in ritual practice, successive gwanbok were more often than not locally manufactured in Korea with different colours and adopted into hanbok. The gwanbok, which was used as the uniform of court officials (including civil court officials), formed part of the gwanbok system and was used like the suit is nowadays.

== History and development ==
Before adopting foreign systems, Korea had its own gwanbok system based on indigenous hanbok, mostly rooted in indigenous ranking systems and state religion like Mu-ism. They favoured luxurious clothes like purple clothing for the top ranks and had decorative golden metal crowns and pointy hats called adorned with metal accessories and feathers. Silla and the other three kingdoms of Korea each had a version of the Bone-rank system where each social rank were allowed only certain clothes and certain ranks in court.

The rulers and the upper class in Korea's history adopted different kinds of foreign-influenced clothing in each dynasty, mostly from China's Tang, Song, Yuan, and Ming dynasties, while the commoners were generally less influenced by these foreign trends and their indigenous aesthetic continued to be seen in their clothing. Despite wearing foreign-influenced clothing, the rulers and the upper class still wore clothing that were indigenous outside of court. Under the dominance of the Han dynasty, Goguryeo and the little states (Hanja: 小國) were bestowed attires and other miscellaneous items from the Han dynasty court. In the Goryeo dynasty, the gwanbok system was largely influenced by the clothing system of other cultures, especially by the Han-Chinese ruled dynasties, the Mongolian Empire, the Khitan Liao dynasty (which adopted the ritual practice of bestowing gwanbok from the Later Jin in the 10th century and later imitated the practice), and the Jurchen Jin dynasty. In Korea, whenever a new dynasty was established, the Korean ruler and his court would be bestowed official clothing from the Chinese emperor. This ritual of the Chinese Emperor bestowing official attire also included the official attire of the Korean Kings in the Goryeo and Joseon dynasties known as the Gonryongpo.

=== Goguryeo ===
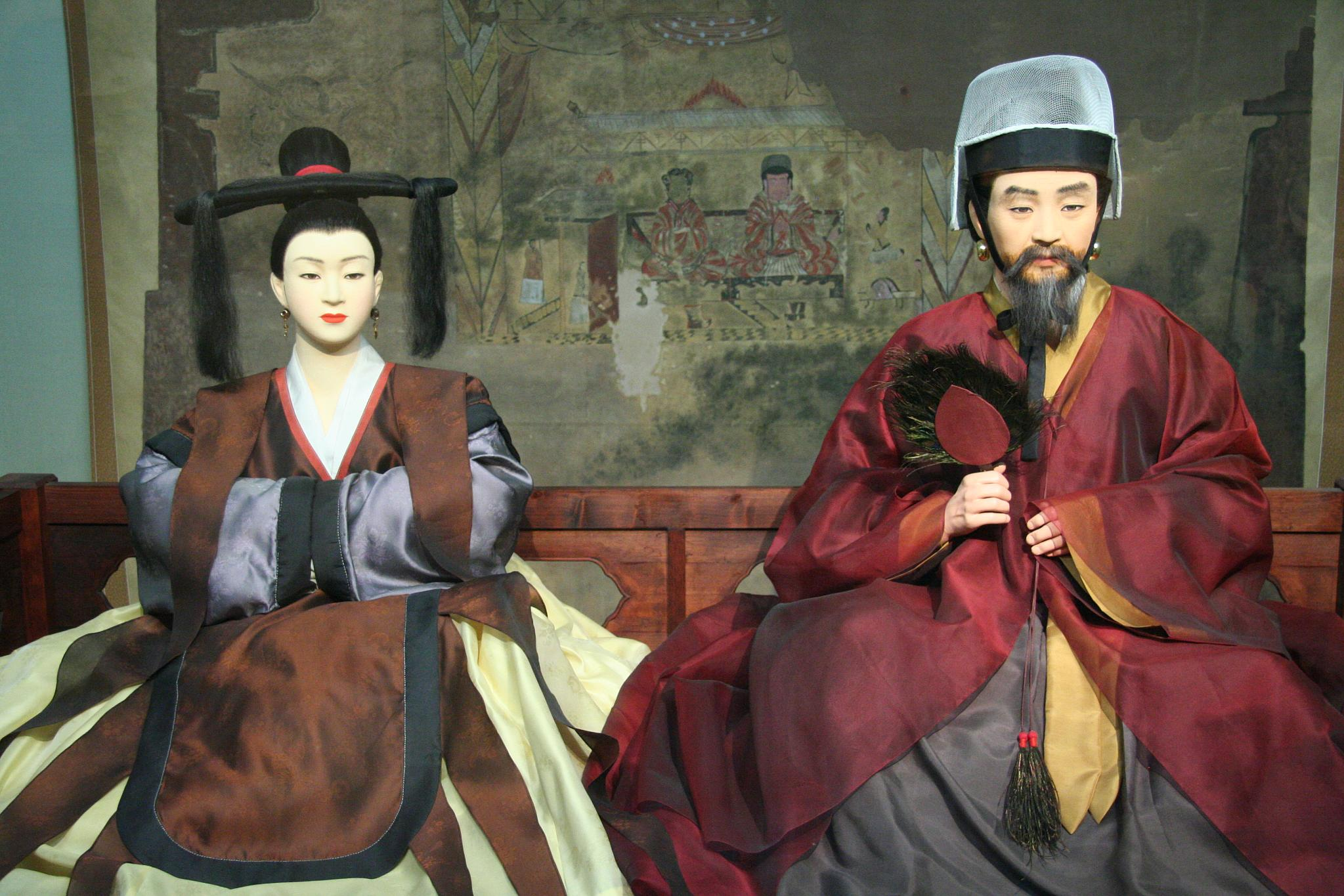
Reconstruction of the Goguryeo king's and queen's attire. The royal attire was known as ochaebok, Three Kingdoms of Korea

After Gojoseon of Liaodong was defeated by the Han dynasty of China, four Chinese commanderies known as the Han-Sagoon were established in the region in 108 BCE. Proto-Koreanic entities were in constant conflict with these states until Goguryeo eventually ousted the Chinese from those regions by the early 4th century CE. One of them was the Daebang Commandery, established between 204 and 314 CE, and another was the Nakrang Commandery which continued to exist until the early fourth century CE and transmitted Han dynasty culture and lifestyle to the regions, including the Korean peninsula. Even after the ousting, Goguryeo court attire shows influences of the guanfu system.

A long type of po was introduced to Goguryeo and originated from the long paofu which was worn by the Han Chinese in court.

Another form of robe was the mid-calf po, which originated from the Northern Chinese, and was used to fend against cold weather; this form of robe was adopted by the Goguryeo upper class for various ceremonies and rituals. This court po was eventually modified and became the durumagi with no vents. According to Samuel Lee:

"[Goguryeo] [m]urals also show that both men and women wore chima. The type worn by both for formal occasions was sang and that worn only by women was goon, which had long and wide dimensions. The origin of durumagi, the long outer coat worn over a jeogori, goes back to the Goguryeo period. The durumagi emanates from the long coat worn by northern Chinese to fend off cold weather in ancient times. The long coats [of the northern Chinese] reached mid-calf and had bindings similar to those used for jeogori. Later, this [long coat] was adopted by the Goguryeo upper class in various forms for ceremonies and rituals, and the modified form [of the court po] worn by the general populace came to be known as durumagi."

The court po was used for ceremonies and rituals, as well as in the royal attire goguryeo called the ochaebok. (Note: The royal attire of goguryeo was called ochaebok, and it was worn with a red coloured floor-length po, see picture depicting the reconstruction of the ochaebok provided by Lee, Samuel Songhoon (2013)) And, what is now currently known as the durumagi forms part of the indigenous hanbok attire as:

한국 민족의 고유복식은 저고리와 바지, 두루마기로 돼 있다. 이런 복식은 북방 호복(胡服)계열로 바지를 착용했다는 것은 기마민족(騎馬民族)이었음을 의미한다는 것이다.
The traditional clothing of the Korean people consists of a jeogori, baji, and a durumagi. This kind of attire is related to the northern hobok, and wearing pants means that they were a horse-riding people.

The Han dynasty influences can also be observed in the tomb murals of Goguryeo which were primarily painted in two regions: Ji'an (集安) and Pyeongyang, which are the second and third capitals of Goguryeo from the middle of the 4th to the middle of the 7th centuries respectively. The Goguryeo murals dating from this period in the region of Ji'an typically shows the characteristics of the people of Goguryeo in terms of morals and customs while those found in the regions of Pyeongyang would typically show the cultural influence of the Han dynasty, including figures dressed in Chinese-style attire, as the Han dynasty had governed this geographical region for approximately 400 years.

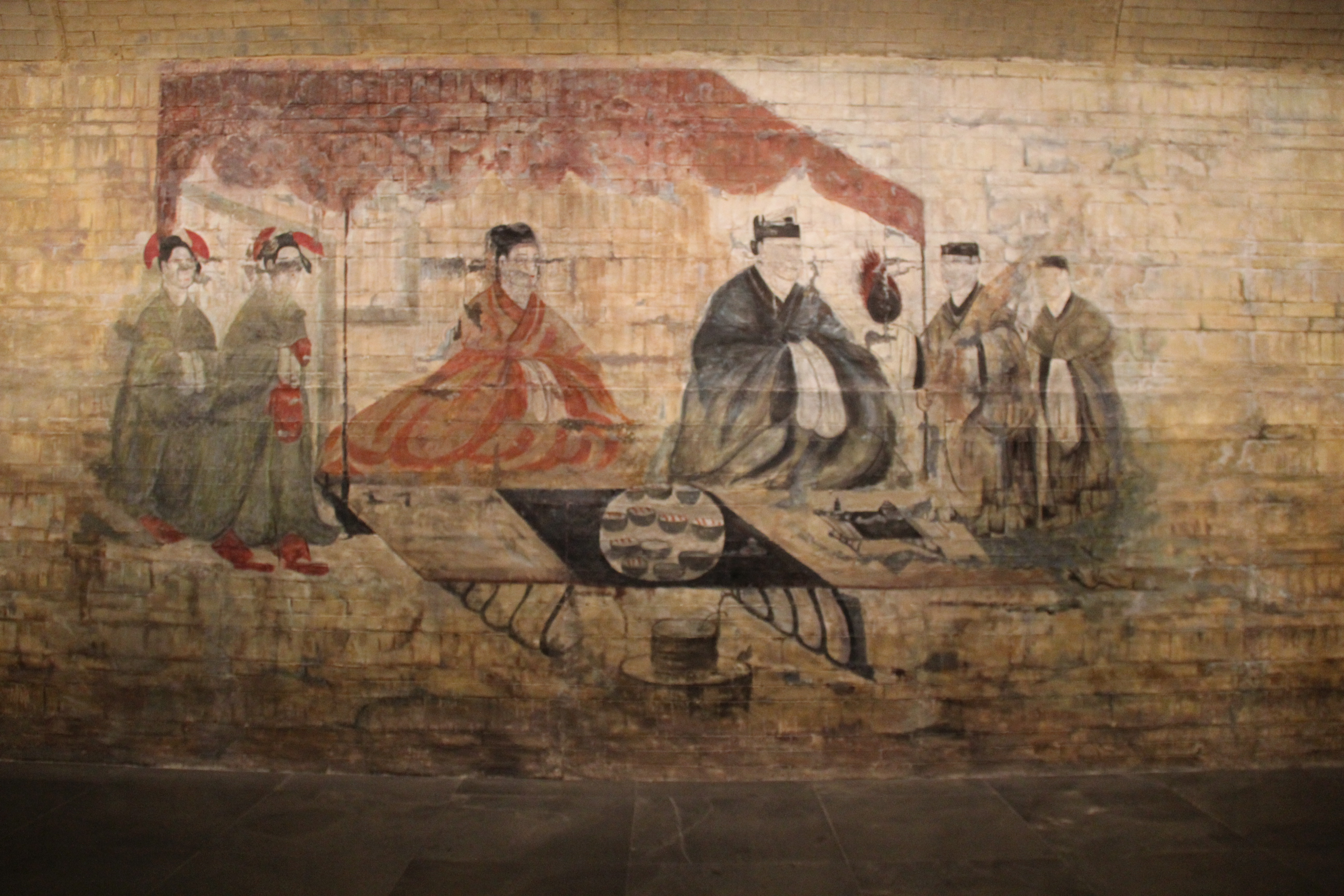
Chinese paofu, Han dynasty

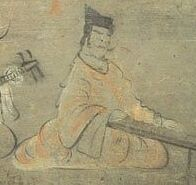
Chinese paofu worn by men, 5th AD

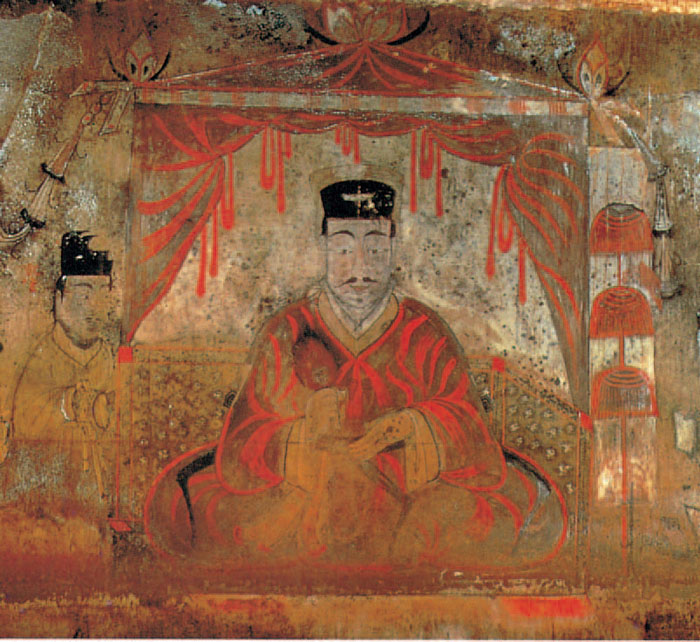
Male tomb owner wearing an ancient Chinese paofu, Anak Tomb No.3, Goguryeo, c. 357

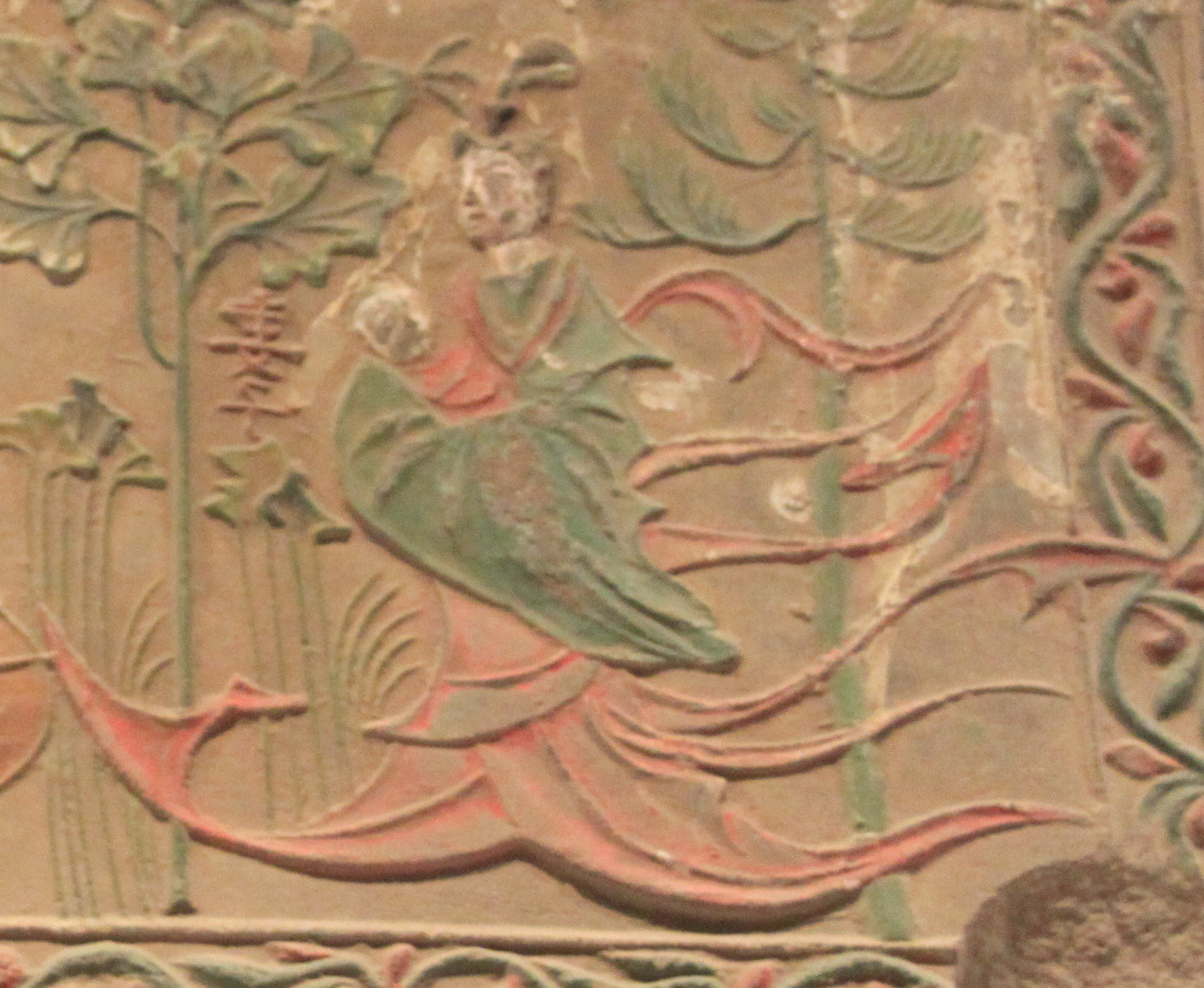
Zaju chuishao fu, Wei, Jin, or Southern-Northern Dynasties

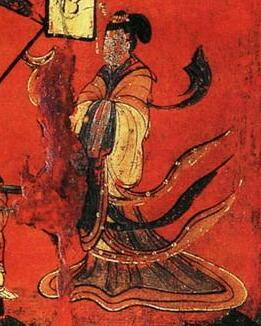
zaju chuishao fu, Northern Wei dynasty

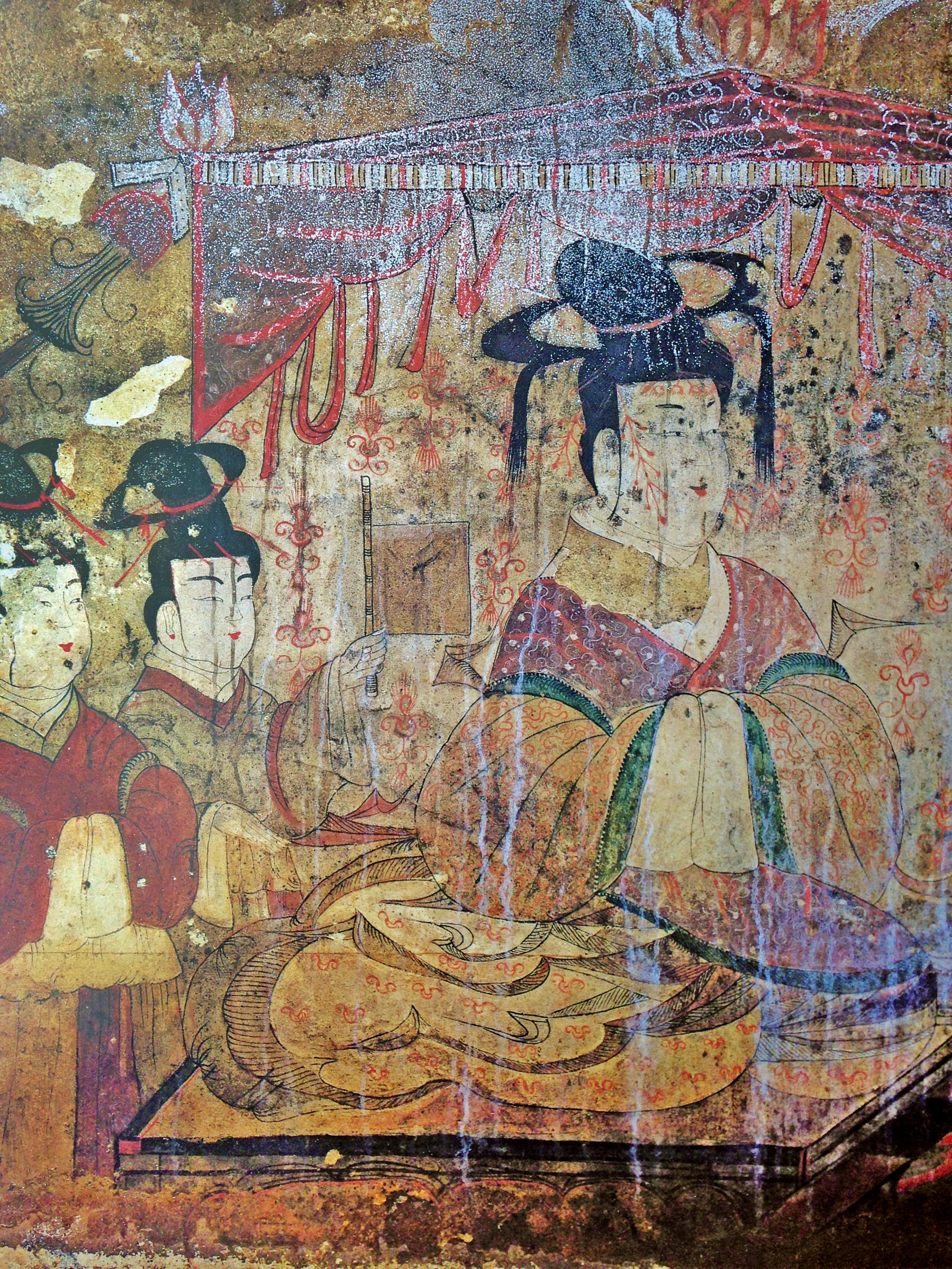
Wife of tomb owner wearing the Chinese zaju chuishao fu, Anak Tomb No.3, Goguryeo, c. 357

The Goguryeo mural paintings found near Pyeongyang, such as the Anak Tomb No. 3 of Goguryeo dated 357 AD located near Pyeongyang, shows also strong influences of the Eastern Han dynasty which appears to have continued lingering in the regions of Manchuria during the third and early fourth centuries CE. The subjects and characteristics found on the murals are derived from the murals found in the Eastern Han dynasty tombs of China. The tomb owner is depicted as an idealized official of the Eastern Han dynasty being seated in frontal position wearing a Chinese paofu; the closest prototype of this mural painting can be found in the mural from the Yuantaizi Tomb in Chaoyang country, Liaoning, dating from the 4th century CE. The painting of the wife of the tomb owner wears a multi-layered Chinese attire, known as the zaju chuishao fu (Chinese: 杂裾垂髾服), and may indicate the Chinese clothing-style of the Six dynasties period. The Anak Tomb No. 3 also exerted strong influences on the subsequent development of iconography, structure, and tomb mural painting techniques found in the Goguryeo tombs.

Traces of influences from the Han dynasty continued to appear in the early 5th century Goguryeo tomb murals located in the Pyeongyang areas, such as those from the Gamsinchong (龕神塚) where the ancient durumagi worn by the owner of Gamsinchong tomb was red (or purple) in colour and had wide sleeves. It is also worn with a waist belt similarly to the native Korean durumagi-po-style.

[Tomb Owner] This figure is sitting on a flat bench under a red curtain, in a purple durumagi (a traditional Korean men’s overcoat) with both hands held inside the wide sleeves on his chest. He wears a dark silk hat that shows his high societal position.

— National Museum of Korea, Quarterly Magazine Vol. 07, No. 07, Spring 2009

Illustrations of maids from the same tomb are also depicted wearing clothing attire which are similar to those worn from the North and South dynasties of China to the Tang dynasty the clothing attire of these maids are different from the one worn by the maids in the murals in Ji'an. Moreover, Goguryeo, influenced by the Chinese, also developed the ritual of bestowing attire to smaller entities, such as Silla, which in turn did so to other smaller entities.

==== Silla and Baekje ====
Southern parts of the Korean Peninsula had less influence from mainland political entities. The influence of Goguryeo can be seen in Silla court clothing, which included a similar decorative apron with triangles but under their jeogori (top) in a more indigenous fashion. Baekje had formed its own gwanbok system with influences from Silla that in turn influenced the Japanese court attire of the Yayoi and Kofun periods.

=== North-South States period and Goryeo dynasty ===
==== Unified Silla ====
The official guanfu system of the Tang dynasty was brought into Korea in 647 AD by Kim Chunchu who travelled to the Tang to request clothing and belts. The danryeong (Korean: 단령; Hanja: 團領; RR: danryeong) and the bokdu (Korean: 복두; Hanja: 幞頭) are assumed to have been brought back by Kim Chunchu under the reign of Queen Jindeok of Silla and used as the uniform of court officials.

==== Balhae ====
In Balhae, the official attire of civil and military officials were issued by the state. During King Mun's reign, Balhae started to integrate Tang dynasty elements, such as the bokdu and danryeong into its official attire. The official court attire in Balhae varied in colour based on the rank of the official; the colours worn were purple, red, light red, and green.

==== Goryeo ====
In Goryeo, the gwanbok was typically influenced by the Tang and Song dynasty. However, due to the instability among mainland political entities, early Goryeo period had no official bestowing of gwanbok by an emperor. Early Goryeo operated with the Emperor at home, king abroad system. They used the emperor’s attire instead of a king. For the Myeonbok, they used the 12 stringed Myeongryugwan instead of 9 and performed rituals reserved for the emperor. The danryeong, which was introduced during the United Silla period, continued to be worn as the outerwear of Goryeo officials and became part of the kingdom's official attire. However, the government officials continued to wear their daily-life clothing, such as a jeogori and baji (trousers) under their gwanbok work clothing. Wearing everyday clothing under gwanbok had already become a tradition since the Unified Silla period. The royalty and aristocrats of Goryeo also wore danryeong and gwanmo that typically followed mainland Song dynasty official attire; this can be observed in Buddhist paintings of the Goryeo era. In 11th century, Goryeo was bestowed with the nine-stringed myeonryugwan and myeonbok and also received official attire from the Khitan Liao and Jurchen Jin dynasties as a sign that both were superior states to Goryeo. This ritual of bestowing attire to recognize a superior was broken during the Mongol Yuan dynasty. After Goryeo was subjugated by the Yuan dynasty of China, the Goryeo kings, royal court, and government had several titles and privileges downgraded to the point that they were no more the equals of the Yuan emperors. The Goryeo kings were themselves demoted from their traditional status of imperial ruler of a kingdom to the status of a lower-rank king of a vassal state; as such they were forbidden from wearing the yellow goryongpo (dragon robes) as it was reserved for the Yuan emperors. At that time, they had to wear a purple goryongpo instead of a yellow one. During the Mongol Yuan and late Goryeo period, Goryeo received Mongolian formal attire such as jilson as a sign of trust and Anda. Goryeo kings at that time sometimes wore Mongol attire instead; several Mongol clothing elements were adopted in the attire of Goryeo. Goryeo clothing-style customs also became popular at the end of the Yuan dynasty among Mongol rulers, aristocrats, queens and imperial concubines in the capital city under the influence of Empress Gi (a former Kongnyo and last empress of the Yuan dynasty, lit. "tribute women") when she was elevated as empress in 1365, a few years before the Yuan dynasty ended in 1368, and when she started to recruit many Goryeo women as court maids. The fashion trend was dubbed goryeoyang (Chinese: 高麗樣; pinyin: gāolíyàng; lit. 'Goryeo-style') in ancient Chinese poetry from the Yuan dynasty and was described as being a banryeong banbi (Chinese: 方領半臂; pinyin: fānglǐng bànbì; lit. 'square collared half-arm'); without any visual illustration or unearthed artefacts of the banryeong banbi, a suggested modern interpretation of the physical appearance of such garment was drawn in a 2005 study by senior researcher Choi based on the description provided by the same poem. According to Hyunhee Park:

"Like the Mongolian style, it is possible that this Koryŏ style [Koryŏ yang] continued to influence some Chinese in the Ming period after the Ming dynasty replaced the Yuan dynasty, a topic to investigate further."

The ritual bestowal of Gwanbok only resumed in late Goryeo. In an attempt to restore new cultural norms which they perceived as being non-contaminated by the Mongol cultural influences, King Gongming and King U of Goryeo tried to establish amicable diplomatic relationship with the Ming dynasty and voluntarily requested to be bestowed clothing from the Ming dynasty, which included their royal attire (e.g. the goryongpo) and thus recognized the superiority of the Ming dynasty.

=== Joseon ===
==== Court clothing ====
The Gwanbok system of Joseon continued the one used from the late Goryeo period and based itself on an early Ming dynasty court attire. During the coup d’etat of Yi Seong-gye, Joseon had created its own gwanbok style, such as the blue gonryongpo, a color representing the east. However, since the establishment of the Joseon dynasty, the Joseon court developed stronger ties with Ming China and followed the Confucian dress system which became outlined in the Gyeongguk daejeon《경국대전; 經國大典; lit. 'The Great Compendium of the State Laws of Joseon'》, a legal system which established Joseon as a vassal state and recognized China as the Suzerain. As such to reinforce this strict hierarchical system, the Joseon Gwanbok system had to two ranks below that of China as Joseon was a vassal state while China was the suzerain. But among other countries in the Sinosphere, Joseon was ranked second after Imperial China according to the concept of minor Sinocentrism, known as So-junghwa sasang (Korean: 소중화사상; Hanja: 小中華思想; lit. 'Little China ideology'), with the Joseon dynasty equating Sinicization, junghwa (Korean: 중화; Hanja: 中華; lit. 'China'), with civilization.

Even after the fall of the Ming dynasty when the Chinese empire was no longer ruled by Han Chinese people, the rulers of Joseon did not regard the Manchu as the legitimate rulers of China; instead, they viewed the Joseon court as "the only true, legitimate heir to [the] Ming dynasty". This belief was reflected in the Joseon gwanbok, which continued to show the Ming dynasty-based clothing design. It was also the pride of Joseon to preserve Confucian culture and visually manifest it through the traditional dress system of the Ming dynasty.

Moreover, the animosity caused by the Later Jin invasion fuelled this notion which continued due to the Qing invasion of Joseon. Joseon continued to use the Ming dynasty-based gwanbok rather than receiving the Manchu-style guanfu, which they considered as being hobok and ironically barbaric. In the later half of the Joseon dynasty, as new gwanbok could not be requested from the fallen Ming, it was instead manufactured in Korea which leads to its localization, such as the uniquely Korean U-shaped collar found in the danryeong, which can also be seen in later forms of wonsam.

==== Korean Empire ====
During the times of the Korean Empire, Emperor Gojong appropriated the highest formal, imperial dress of the Ming dynasty when he was enthroned as Emperor in 1897; Emperor Gojong wore the goryongpo and had changed the original colour of his red goryongpo to yellow, which was the same colour reserved to the Emperor of China. Only Emperor Gojong and Emperor Sunjong were able to wear the yellow goryongpo. He also wore a myeongbok decorated with the Twelve Ornaments along with a mianguan with twelve beaded strings; a style of attire which he had appropriated from the mianfu Chinese emperor when he declared himself emperor as he was only supposed to wear nine beaded strings when he was a feudal king. He also upgraded his jobok to that of the Chinese Emperor's by including the tongtianguan (통천관; 通天冠; tongcheongwan) with twelves liang (Chinese: 梁; pinyin: liáng; lit. 'beam') of jade strings which was reserved for the Emperor, thus, replacing his yuanyouguan (원유관; 遠遊冠; wonyugwan) which was worn by the feudal kings. He also included the jiangshapao (강사포; 絳紗袍; gangsapo) in his jobok.

==== Wedding dress ====
The commoner men were only allowed to wear gwanbok (관복; 官服) on the day of their wedding. The wedding gwanbok was usually deep blue or violet in colour.

== Types of gwanbok ==
There were several types of gwanbok (관복; 冠服) according to status, rank, and occasion, such as jobok, jebok, sangbok, gongbok, yungbok, and gunbok. However, the term gwanbok (관복; 官服) used in a narrow scope only denote the gongbok and the sangbok, which typically refers to the danryeong-style attire, worn by the court officials.

=== Gongbok ===
The gongbok (공복; 公服; lit. 'diplomatic attire') was worn when officers had an audience with the king at the palace.

=== Jebok ===
The jebok (제복; 祭服; lit. 'ritual attire') was the gwanbok which was worn as the official mourning attire. It was worn by civil and military officials when the King would hold memorial services at the Royal Ancestral Shrine where he would perform ancestor veneration ritual, called jesa.

The robe was a danryeong with large-sleeves which was made of black silk gauze; it was worn with a jegwan (mourning cap), a red skirt, a dae (girdle), a bangshim-gokryeong (a ritual token which was attached to the round collar), a husu (a black apron with embroidery and tassels), leggings, Korean cotton socks, and low-sided shoes called hye. The joogdan (inner garment) was made of white silk, the white neck band of the inner robe was visible under the jebok. A red apron was worn between the jebok and the joogdan.

=== Jeogui ===
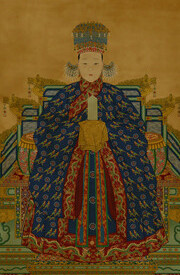
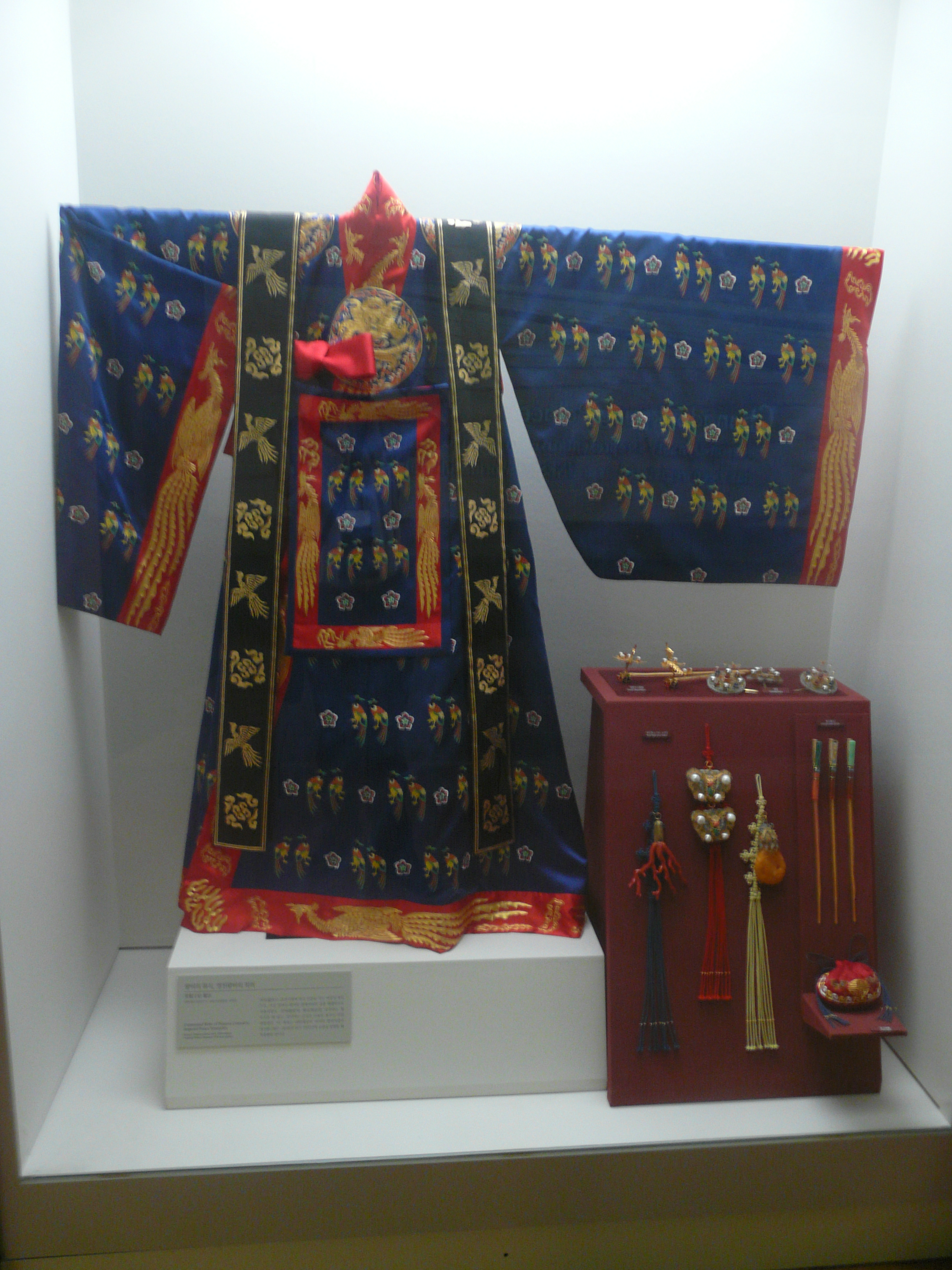
Left: Chinese Diyi of the Ming dynasty. Right: Korean Jeokdui, modified from the Chinese diyi, Korean Empire.

The jeogui (적의; 翟衣), also called referred as gwanbok, myeongbok, and yebok (예복; 禮服; lit. 'ritual clothing'), was worn by the queen, crown princess, the wife of the crown prince's son and other women of legitimate royal lineage; it was a ceremonial robe. It was worn from the time of King Gongmin of Goryeo to the time of King Yeongchin in 1922. However, the early Joseon jeogui was different from the one developed and worn in the late Joseon and during the Korean empire.

In the early Joseon, the Ming dynasty bestowed the daehong daesam, a plain red ceremonial robe along with chiljeokgwan, a guan with seven pheasants, to the Joseon queen which was then worn as a ceremonial attire.

In the late Joseon, the jeogui system of Joseon was developed and was modified such that pheasant heads would appear on the back of the daesam along and also added a rank badge to the jeogui. During the Korean empire, the jeogui was modified again and became blue in colour for the Korean queen which was now proclaimed empress; this blue jeogui also expressed the proclamation of Korea as an independent nation.

=== Jobok ===
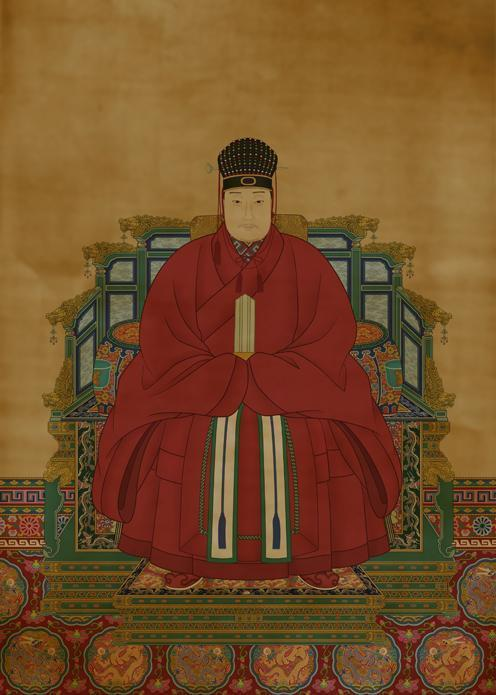
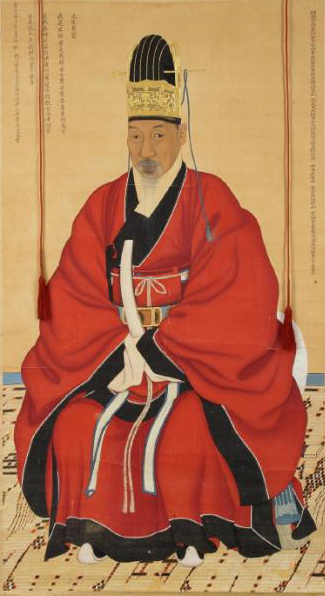
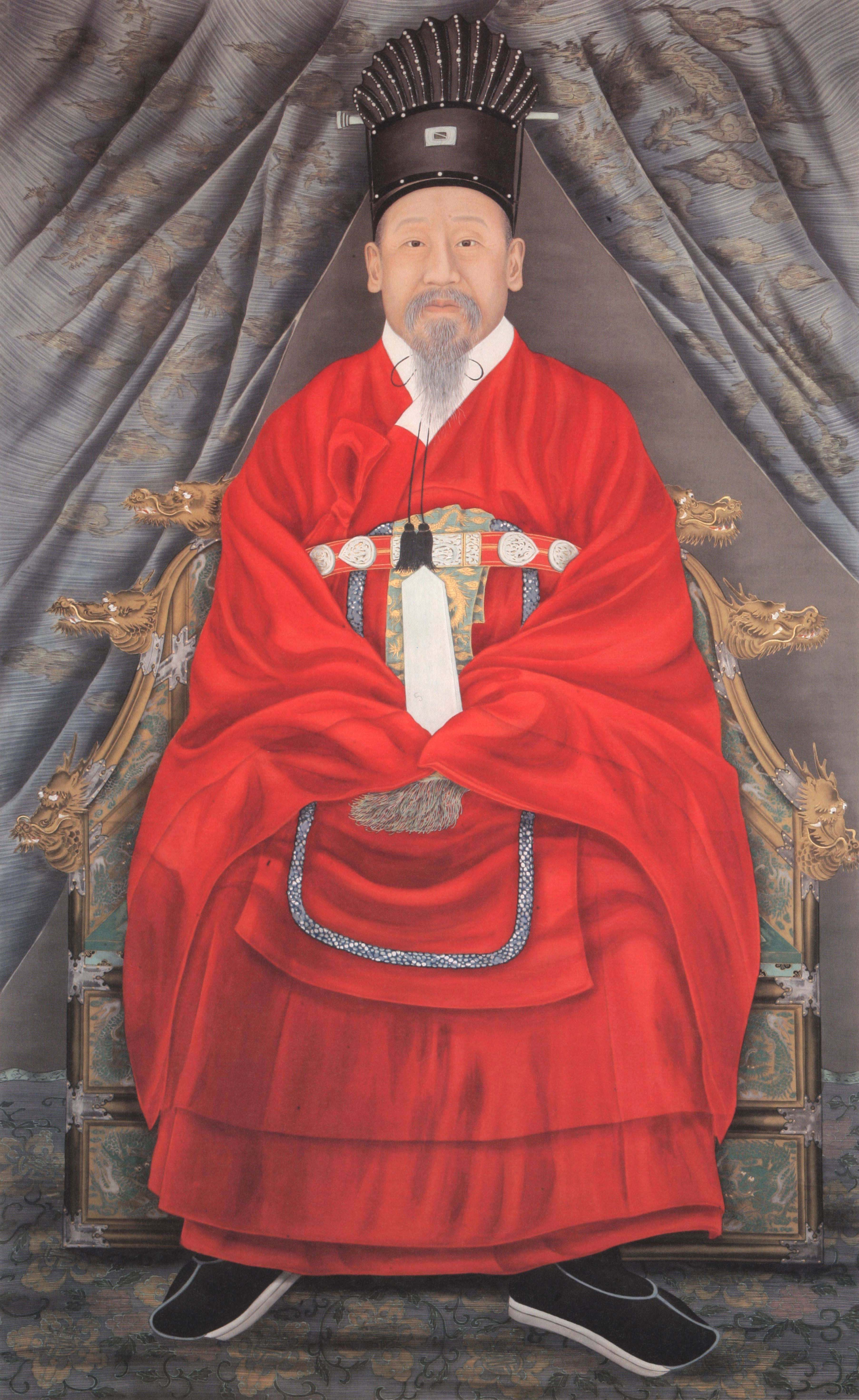
Left: Pien Fu of the Ming dynasty. Middle: Geumgwan Jobok in the late 18th century. Right: Emperor Gojong wearing imperial jobok

The jobok (조복; 朝服; lit. 'court attire') is a form of gwanbok.

It was also the official court attire for the high-ranking military and civil officials; they wore it when they would meet with the King and was worn for important ceremonies. Examples of special occasions were the national festivals, or announcement of royal decrees. The jobok consisted of a wide-sleeved, red silk gauze robe which was worn over a blue inner robe; a red apron was worn in the front of back. On the back, there was a husu, i.e. a rectangular-shaped embroidered insignia. To indicate the rank of the officials, officials wore geumgwan; the geumgwan had gold stripes which would mark its wearer's rank.

During the Korean Empire period, when Emperor Gojong wore the jobok as his attire for imperial audience, he decided to upgrade his jobok to that of the Chinese Emperor's by including the tongtianguan (통천관; 通天冠; tongcheongwan) with twelves liang (Chinese: 梁; pinyin: liáng; lit. 'beam') of jade strings, thus replacing his initial yuanyouguan (원유관; 遠遊冠; wonyugwan) which used by the feudal kings; he also wore the jiangshapao (강사포; 絳紗袍; gangsapo), a red robe which was worn by the Emperor and the feudal kings.

=== Myeongbok ===
The mianfu (면복; 冕服; myeonbok; lit. 'coronation dress') was the most stately habit of the Chinese Emperor, which consisted of a mianguan (면류관; 冕旒冠; myeollyugwan) with twelve beaded strings (면류; 冕旒; myeollyu) and was worn together with the gunfu (곤복; 袞服; gongbok) which was decorated with Twelve Ornaments. The mianfu was the attire which projected the authority of the Chinese Emperor in the Sinosphere. The mianfu was introduced in Korea from China where it became known as myeonbok. The myeonbok was used a ceremonial attire by the Joseon kings, kings, crown prince, and crown grandson from the Goryeo period through the Joseon period.

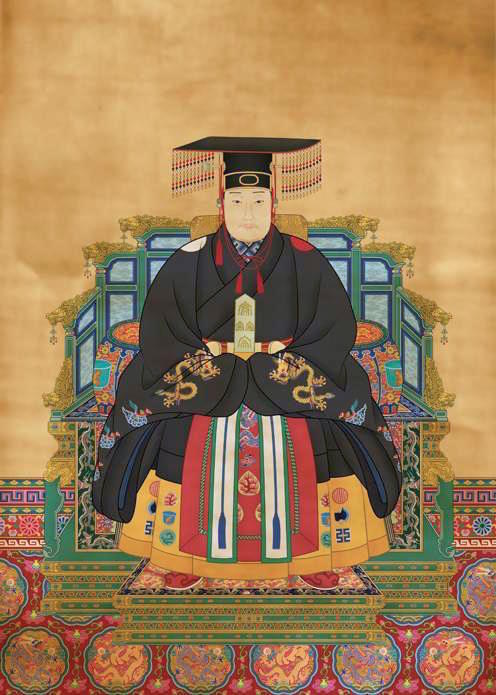
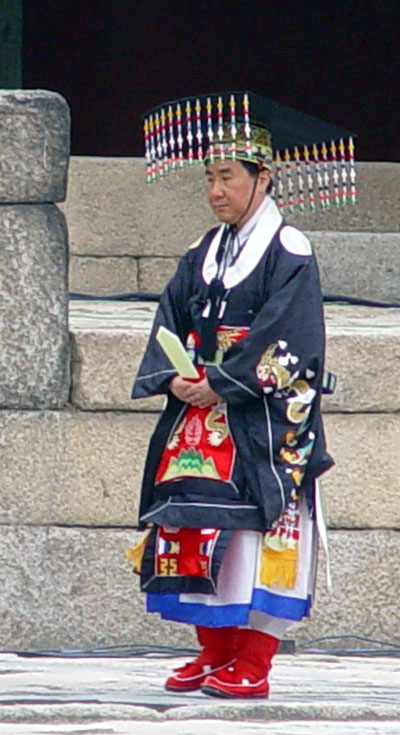
Left: Chinese mianfu of the Ming dynasty. Right: Korean myeonbok with 12 bead strings mianguan, Korean Empire style

The Korean myeonbok differed from the mianfu worn by the Chinese Emperor as the King of Joseon were feudal kings. As feudals kings, the Kings of Joseon were not allowed to use the twelve beaded strings instead they had to use nine beaded strings. Moreover, they were supposed to wear a robe in their myeonbok which was decorated with nine out of the Twelve Ornaments and thus their this robe was referred gujangbok (Hanja: 九章服). The nine ornaments on the gujangbok were either painted or embroidered and they represented the virtue and authority of the King; the crown prince of Joseon on the other hand were only allowed seven out of the twelve ornaments. The myeonbok of Joseon was thus was made up of eleven different pieces of garment and apparels, which included the gui (Hanja: 圭; a jade tablet), the mianguan (면류관; 冕旒冠; myeollyugwan), the ui (Hanja: 衣; Chinese: 衣; pinyin: yī; lit. 'upper garment') which was the gujangbok, the sang (Hanja: 裳), the dadae (Hanja: 大帶; Chinese: 大帶; pinyin: dàdài; lit. 'big belt'), the jungdan (Hanja: 中單; an inner robe), pae (Hanja: 佩), pyeseul (Hanja: 蔽膝; a type of decorative panel), su (Hanja: 綬, ornament), mal (Hanja: 襪 socks), and seok (Hanja: 舃, shoes). There were also instances when Korean kings wore the mianfu reserved for the Emperor. During the years of the Yuan invasion of Goryeo, King Gongmin was recorded to have temporarily worn the myeonbok of an emperor with the Twelve Ornaments and wore the mianguan with twelve beads. However after the establishment of the Ming dynasty, King Gongmin restarted wearing the myeonbok of a feudal king.

Following the fall of the Ming dynasty, the Joseon court decided to establish their own myeonbok system in accordance to their own national customs under the reign of King Yeonjo in 1744. Until 1897, King Yeonjo's guidelines concerning the Joseon myeonbok system remained in effect; some changes were later on implemented with the proclaiming of the Korean Empire. When Emperor Gojong declared himself emperor of Korea when he appropriated the ancient Chinese dress system and wore a myeonbok, which emulated the mianfu with Twelve ornaments and the twelve-beaded string mianguan of the Chinese emperor. The Joseon myeonbok was thus localized and developed into its current form through time.

=== Sangbok ===
The sangbok (상복; 常服; lit. 'official uniform') was worn as a daily official clothing.

=== Yungbok ===
The yungbok was related to military affairs.

== Gallery ==
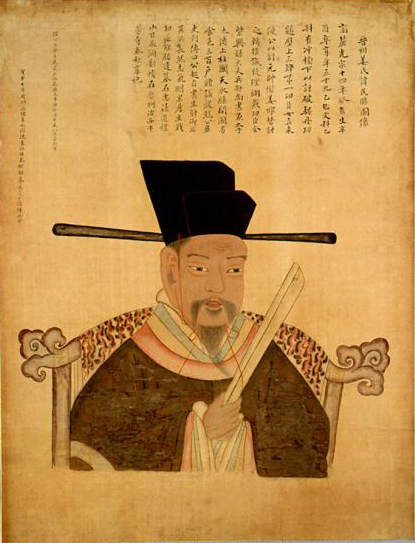
Gwanbok in the Goryeo period, 11th century.

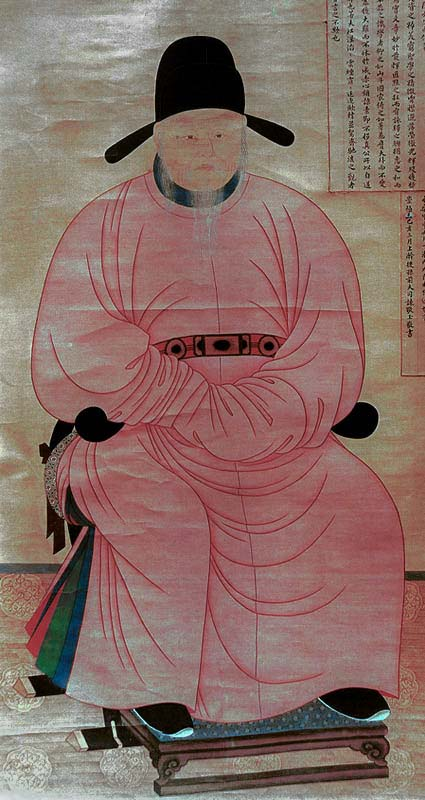
Gwanbok in the Goryeo period, 14th century.

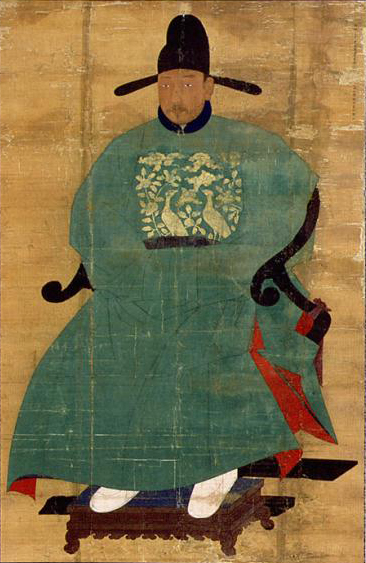
Gwanbok in the 15th century

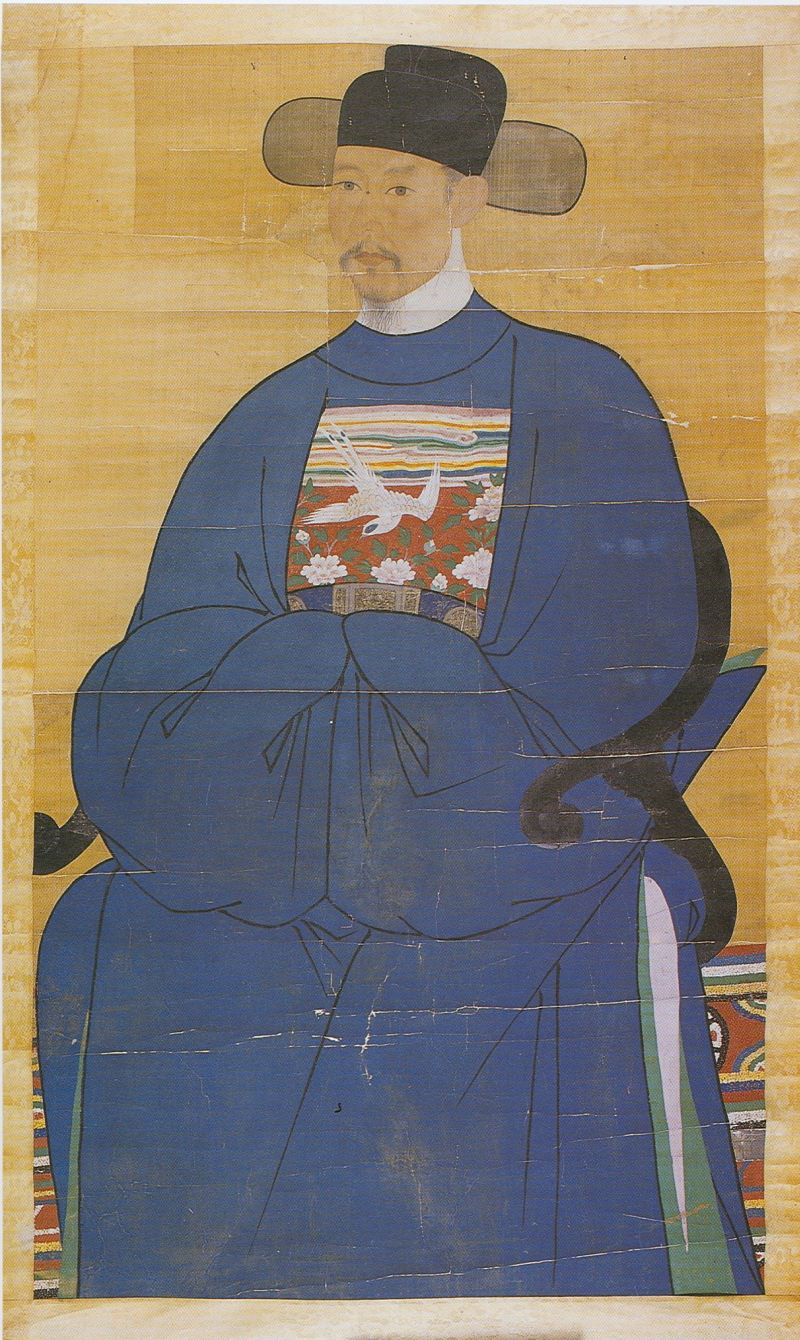
Gwanbok in the 17th century

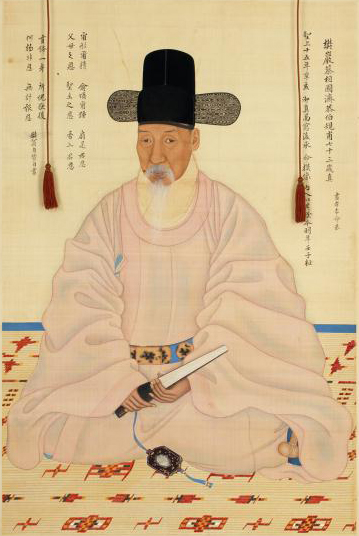
Sibok in the late 18th century

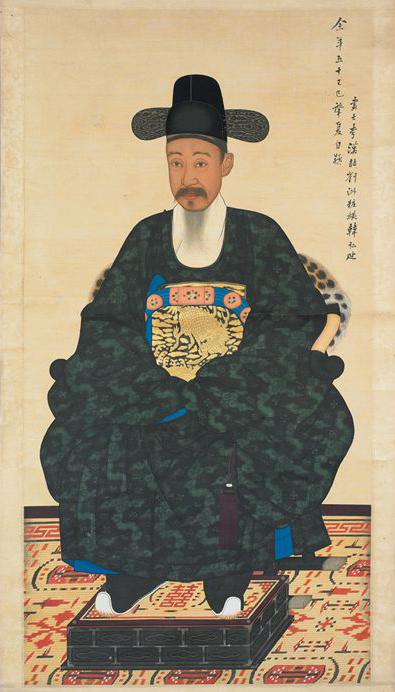
Gwanbok in the 19th century

== See also ==
- Guanfu
- Mianfu
- Myeonbok
- Chinese influence on Korean culture
