= Bianfu =

Red Chinese ceremonial outfit

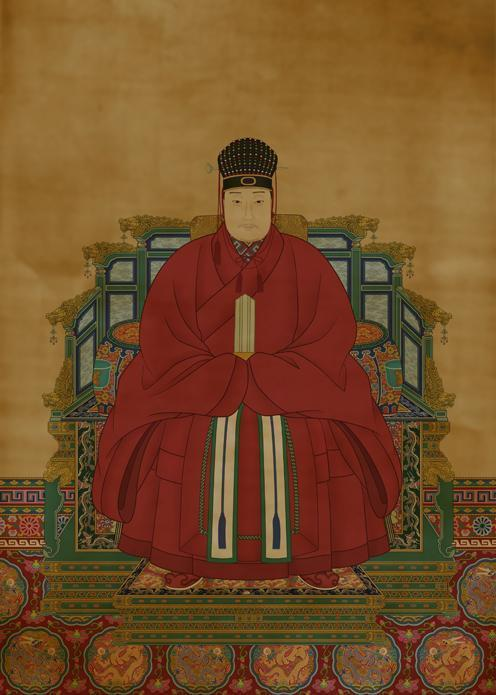
- Ming dynasty emperor wearing pibianfu (皮弁服), a set of attire composed of pibian, a type of guan (headwear), and bianfu (garment)
- Type: Chinese red-coloured set of ceremonial attire in Hanfu
- Material: Silk
- Place of origin: At least the Zhou dynasty, China

Bianfu
- Chinese: 弁服
Transcriptions
Standard Mandarin
- Hanyu Pinyin: biànfú

Bianfu (Chinese: 弁服; pinyin: biànfú) is a historical set of attire in Hanfu consisting of a knee-length Chinese upper garment known as jiangshapao (绛纱袍) over a qun, a Chinese skirt, known as hongchang (红裳; 'red skirt') or pair of ku-trousers along with other accessories. Coupled with the Chinese headwear known as pibian, the complete set of attire is also referred as pibianfu (皮弁服). This set of attire was considered to be a ceremonial dress. In the Zhou dynasty, the bianfu was only ranked-second after the mianfu and it was worn by the emperors when he would work on official business or when he would meet with the court officials.

== Construction and design ==
The upper garment known as jiangshapao (绛纱袍; 絳紗袍) which was red in colour and extended all the way to the knees. This was typically worn over a red skirt known as hongchang (红裳; 'red skirt') that reached the length of the ankles. The wearing of a qun under an upper garment was only worn during formal occasions. Over the hongchang, the wearer wore a red coloured bixi. Under the red outer garments, an inner garment known as zhongdan (中单) was worn. A yugui (玉圭; 'jade tablet') would be held in its wearer's hands; it was further accessorized with yupei (玉佩), daxiaoshou (大小绶; "a ribbon-like accessory"), and the belt called dadai (大带; 大帶). The bian (弁), also known as pibian (皮弁), was a cylinder-shaped guan (headwear) that completed the outfit.

Composition of pibianfu

Jiangshapao (绛纱袍; 絳紗袍)

Pibian (皮弁) according to the Chinese encyclopedia Gujin Tushu Jicheng, between 1700 and 1725.

Dadai (大帶)

== See also ==
- Hanfu
- List of Hanfu
- Mianfu
