= Mianfu =

Chinese royal clothing

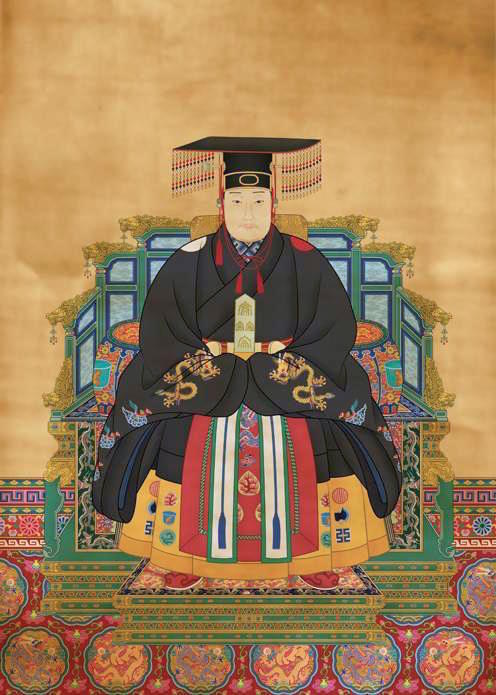
- Painting of Wanli Emperor of the Ming dynasty wearing mianfu
- Type: Traditional imperial robe as part of hanfu
- Place of origin: Shang dynasty, China
- Introduced: Liao dynasty, Jin dynasty (1115–1234), Korea (at least since 1065 AD), Japan, Vietnam. Yuan Dynasty

Mianfu

Chinese name
- Chinese: 冕服
- Literal meaning: Coronation clothing
Transcriptions
Standard Mandarin
- Hanyu Pinyin: Miǎnfú

Vietnamese name
- Vietnamese alphabet: Cổn Miện; Miện phục
- Chữ Hán: 袞冕 冕服

Korean name
- Hangul: 면복
- Hanja: 冕服
Transcriptions
- Revised Romanization: Myeonbok

Mianfu (Chinese: 冕服; pinyin: miǎnfú; lit. 'coronation costume') is a kind of Chinese clothing in hanfu; it was worn by emperors, kings, and princes, and in some instances by the nobles in historical China from the Shang to the Ming dynasty. The mianfu is the highest level of formal dress worn by Chinese monarchs and the ruling families in special ceremonial events such as coronation, morning audience, ancestral rites, worship, new year's audience and other ceremonial activities. There were various forms of mianfu, and the mianfu also had its own system of attire called the mianfu system which was developed back in the Western Zhou dynasty. The mianfu was used by every dynasty from Zhou dynasty onward until the collapse of the Ming dynasty. The Twelve Ornaments were used on the traditional imperial robes in China, including on the mianfu. These Twelve Ornaments were later adopted in clothing of other ethnic groups; for examples, the Khitan and the Jurchen rulers adopted the Twelve ornaments in 946 AD and in 1140 AD respectively. The Korean kings have also adopted clothing embellished with nine out of the Twelve ornaments since 1065 AD after the Liao emperor had bestowed a nine-symbol robe (九章服; jiǔzhāngfú) to the Korean king, King Munjong, in 1043 AD where it became known as gujangbok (Korean: 구장복; Hanja: 九章服; RR: gujangbok).

== Construction and design ==
The mianfu is typically a set of clothing, which includes a type of Chinese crown (guan) called mianguan (冕冠), looked like a board which leans forward and had chains of beads at the front and back. Usually, the mianguan has 12 chains; however, it could also vary in numbers (i.e. 9, 7, 5, 3) depending on the importance of an event and in rank difference. To fasten the mianguan to the hair, hairpins are used. The mianfu was also worn together with other accessories, such as gedai (革带) which is a type of leather belt, dadai (大带) which is a large silk belt, peishou (佩綬) which is a type of ribbon ornament, and clogs with wooden soles called xi (舄) The emperor's mianfu shoes were made of silk with double-layered wooden soles. The shoes could vary in colour depending on events, and by order of importance, the emperor would wear red, white, or black shoes. All these originated from the primitive clothing worn by the shamans in ancient China.

The upper garment of the emperor's mianfu is usually black in colour while the lower garment is crimson red in colour in order to symbolize the order of heaven and earth. The upper and lower garment are tied with a belt. A pure red coloured bixi, an important component for ceremonial clothing, hangs down under the belt. Twelve Ornaments, including the dragons, are the usual decoration of the mianfu. When decorated with all the Twelve Ornaments, the mianfu can be classified as shíèrzhāngfú (十二章服) while decorated with nine out of the twelve symbols, it is can be classified as jiǔzhāngyī (九章衣) or jiǔzhāngfú (九章服).

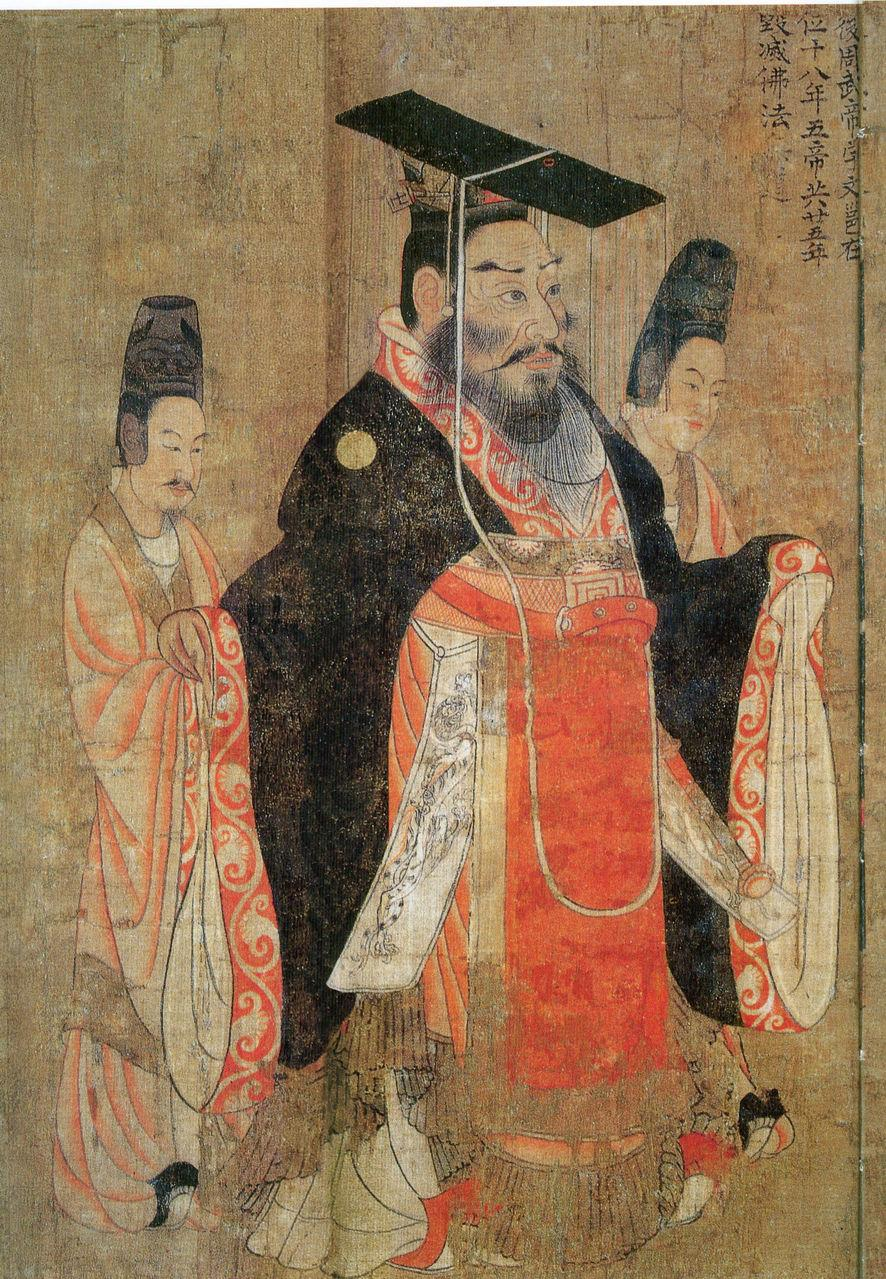
Emperor Wu of Northern Zhou wearing mianfu

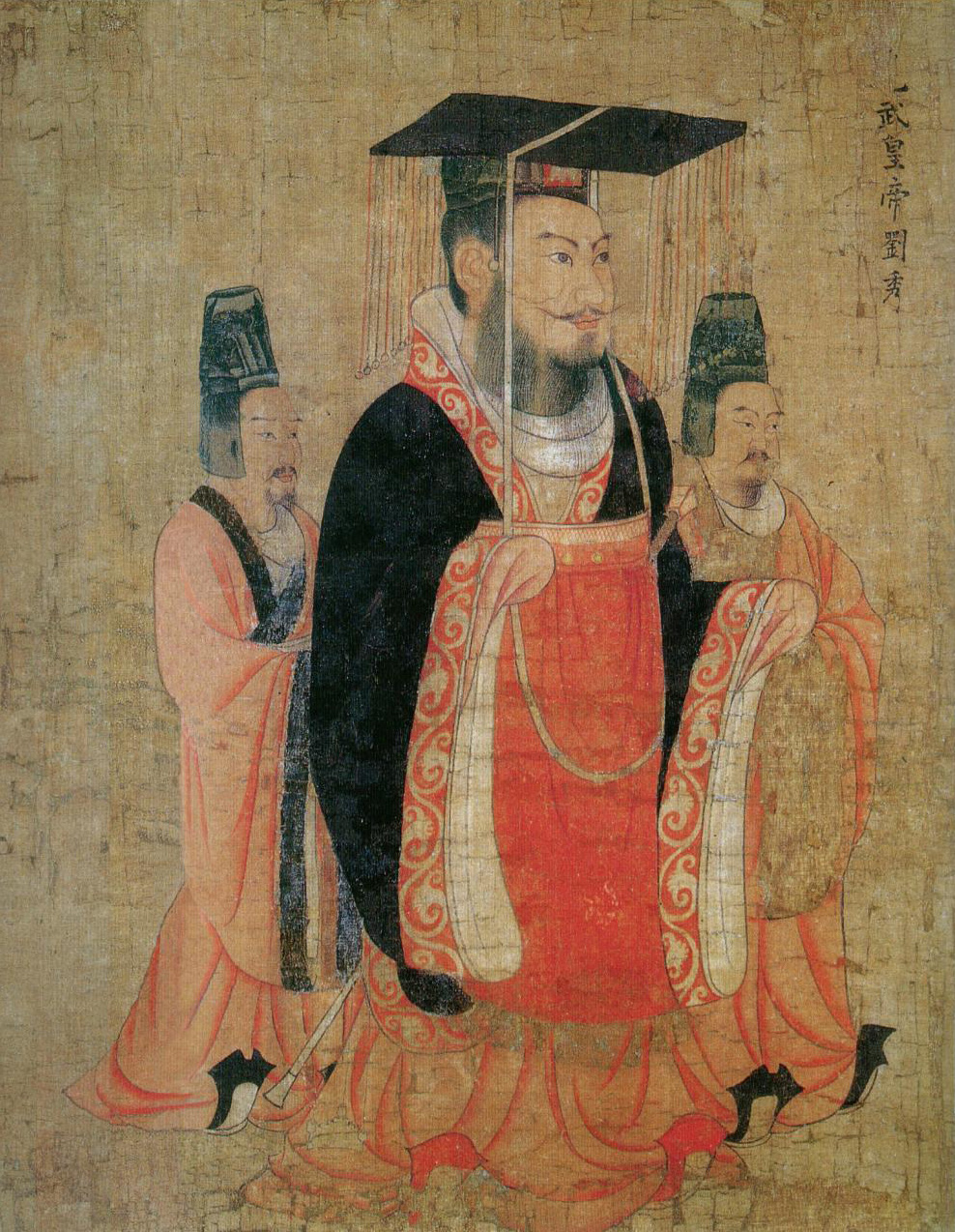
Emperor Wu of Han wearing mianfu

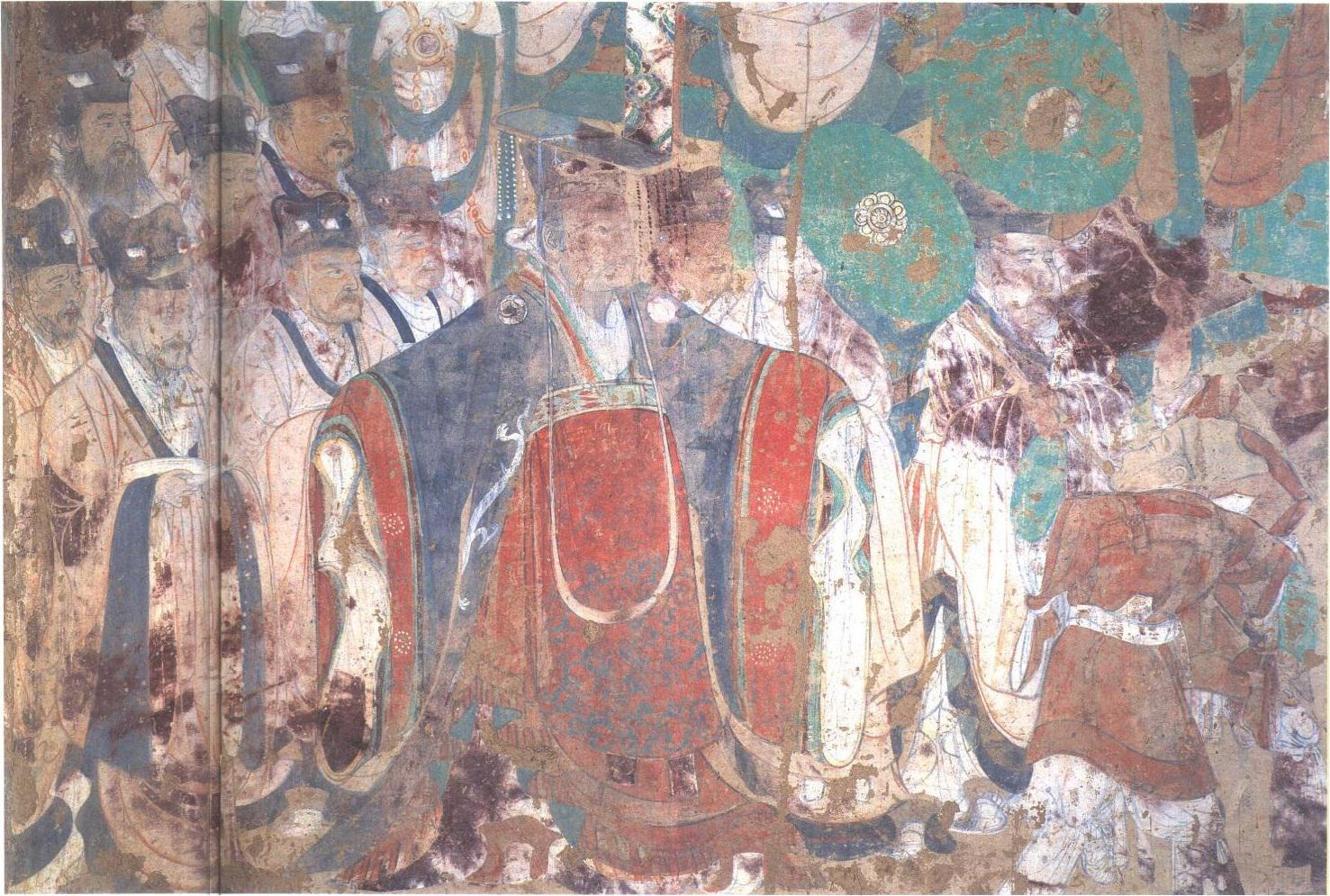
Tang dynasty emperor and officials from Mogao murals from AD 642, located in Cave 220, Dunhuang, Gansu.

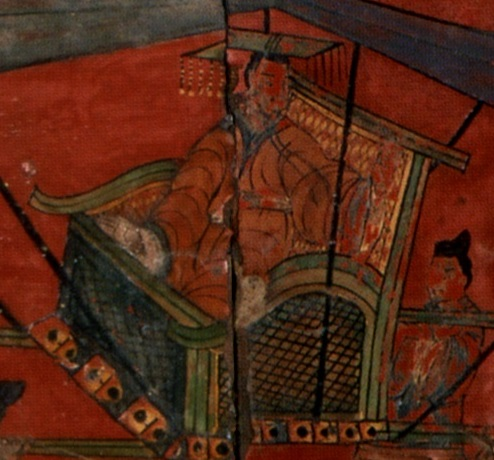
Emperor Cheng of Han as depicted on lacquer screen from Northern Wei.

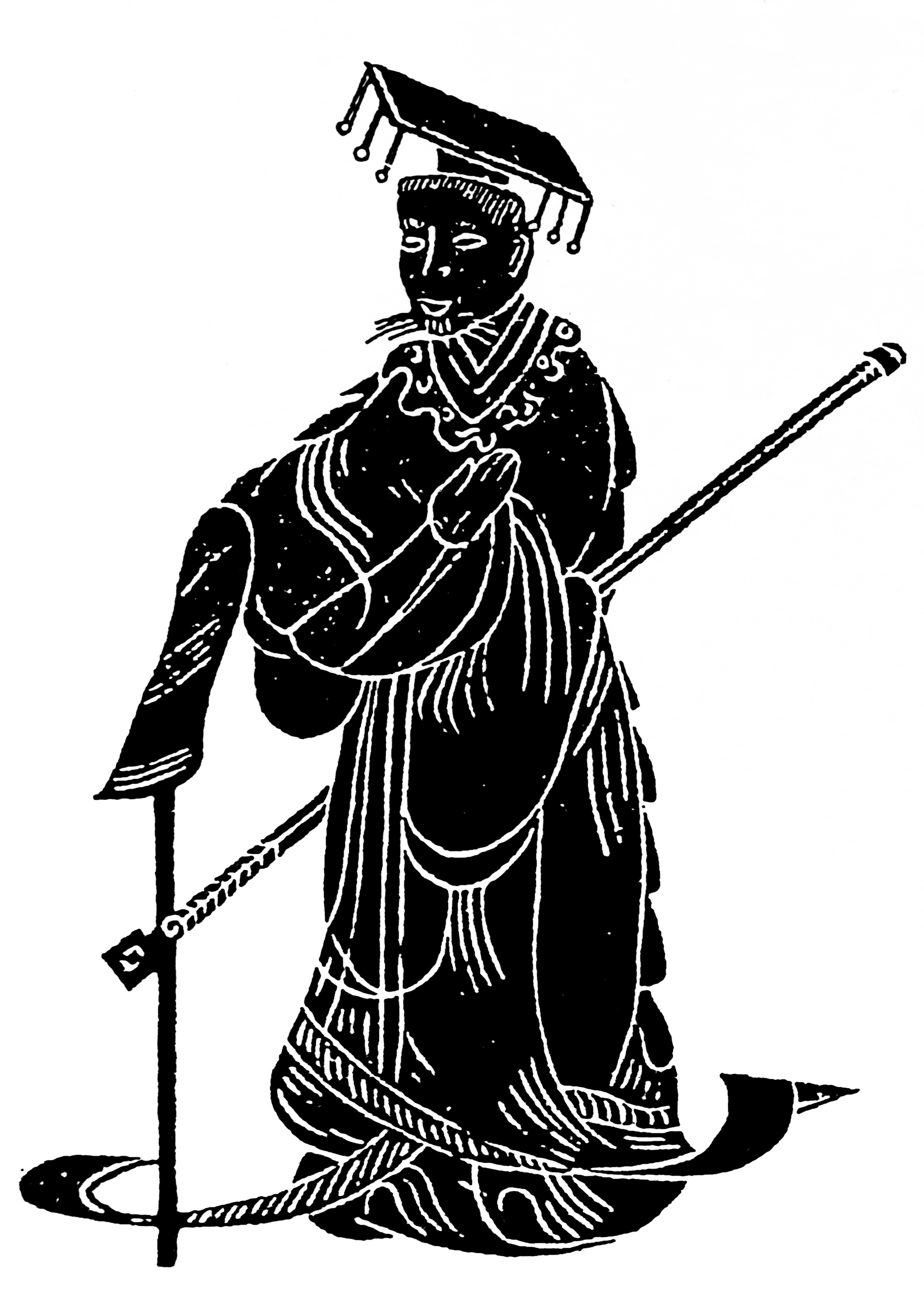
Tracing of figure wearing mianfu in Yinan Tomb stone-relief in Shandong Province.

Gunmianh (袞冕)

Yuanyi (元衣) and Xunchang (纁裳)

Zhongshan (中單) and Bixi (蔽膝)

Gedai (革帶)

Dadai (大帶)

Peishou (佩綬)

Yupei (玉佩)

=== Designs and social ranks ===
There are various forms of mianfu which can be classified in five grades and which was worn by the members of the nobility aside from those worn by the Chinese emperor. The difference in forms and appearance was used to distinguish between the ranks of its wearer; these differences were often form in the number of symbols and the tassels which were attached to the headwear worn in the mianfu. Examples of mianfu include the:

1. Daqiumian (大裘冕; 'great fur mian')
2. Gunmian (袞冕)
3. Bimian (鷩冕; 'golden pheasant mian')
4. Cuimian (毳冕; 'downy mian')
5. Ximian (絺冕; 'linen mian')
6. Xuanmian (玄冕; 'black mian')
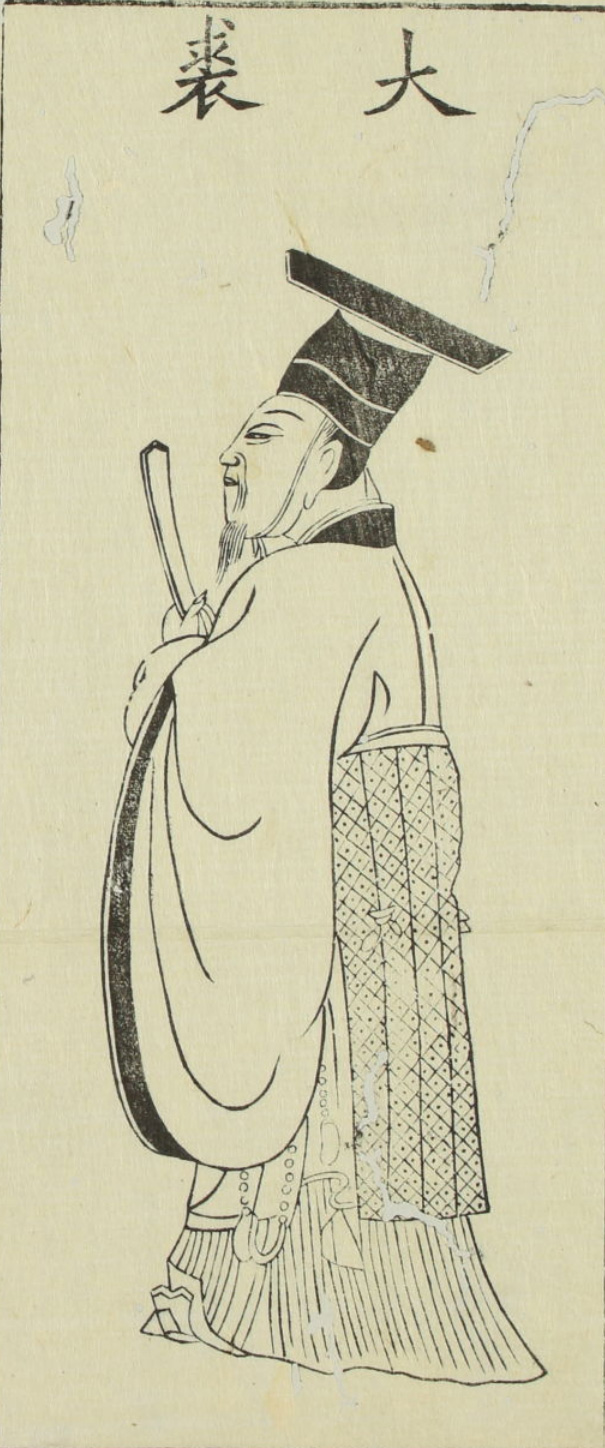
Daqiumian (大裘冕)

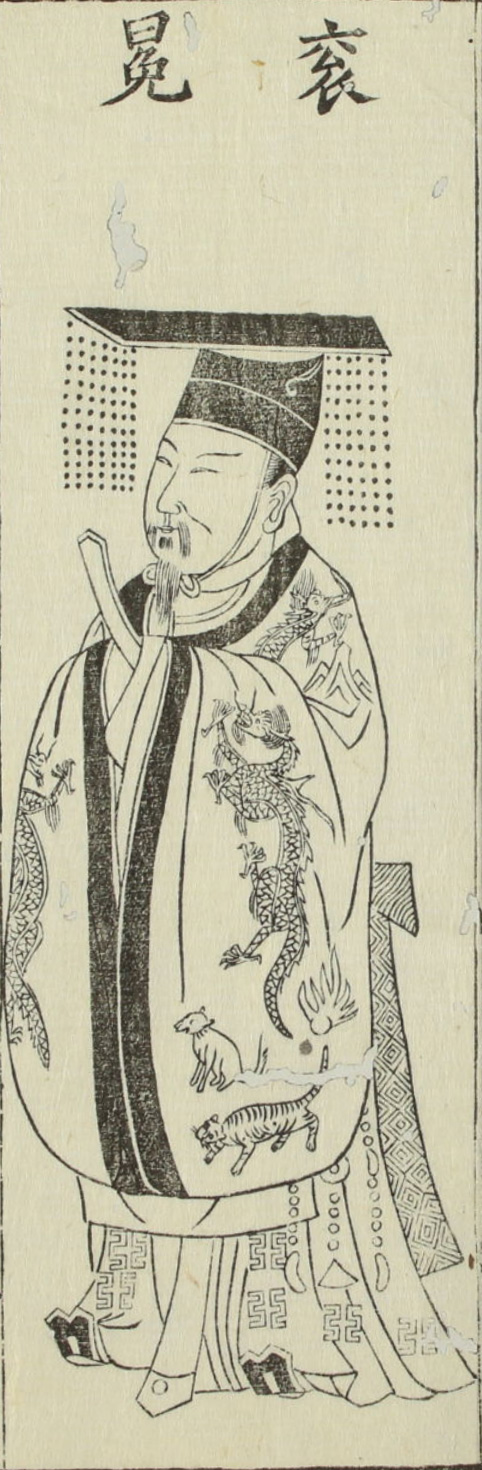
Gunmian (袞冕)

Bimian (鷩冕)

Cuimian (毳冕)

Ximian (絺冕)

=== Mianfu worn by nobility from Sanlitu (三禮圖) ===
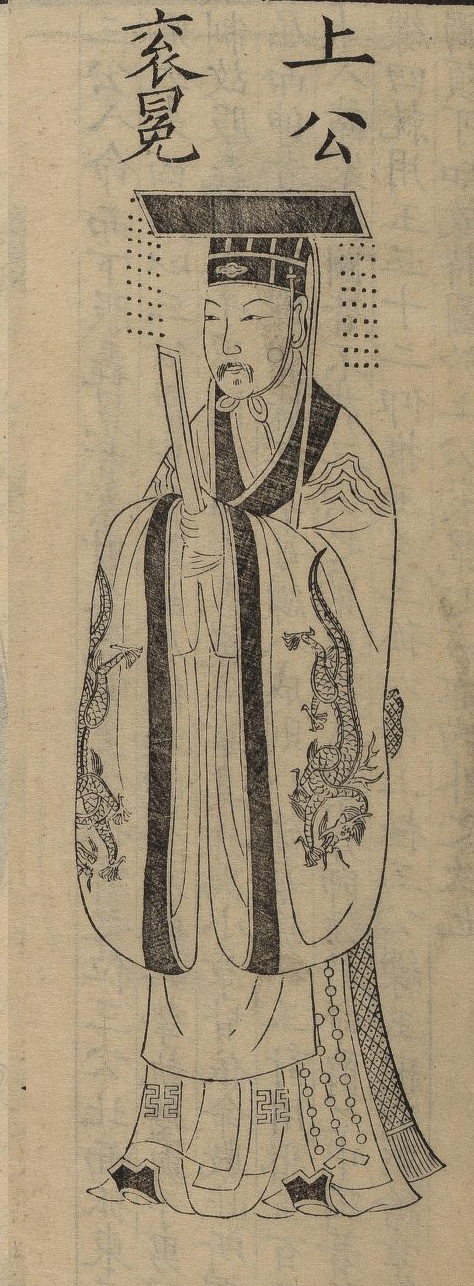
Gunmian for gong (公)

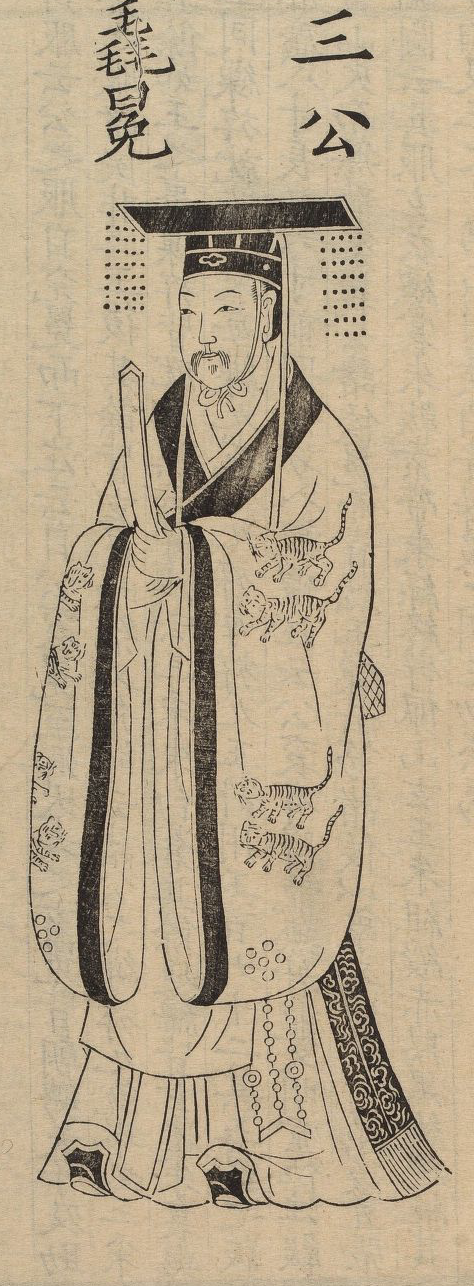
Cuimian for the Three Excellencies

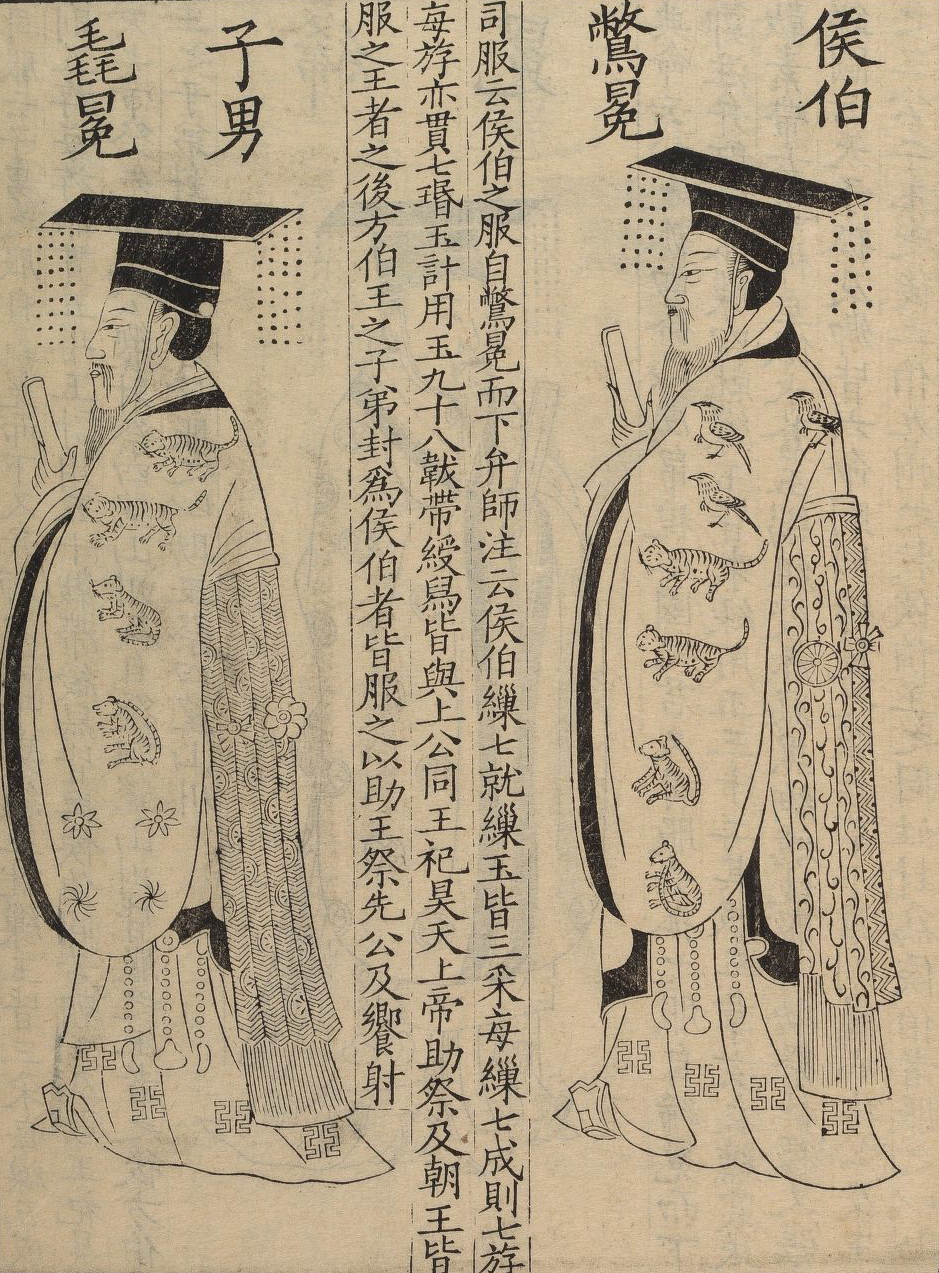
Bimian (鷩冕) and Cuimian (毳冕) ceremonial robes of regional lords (侯伯) and eldest son (of nobility) (子男).

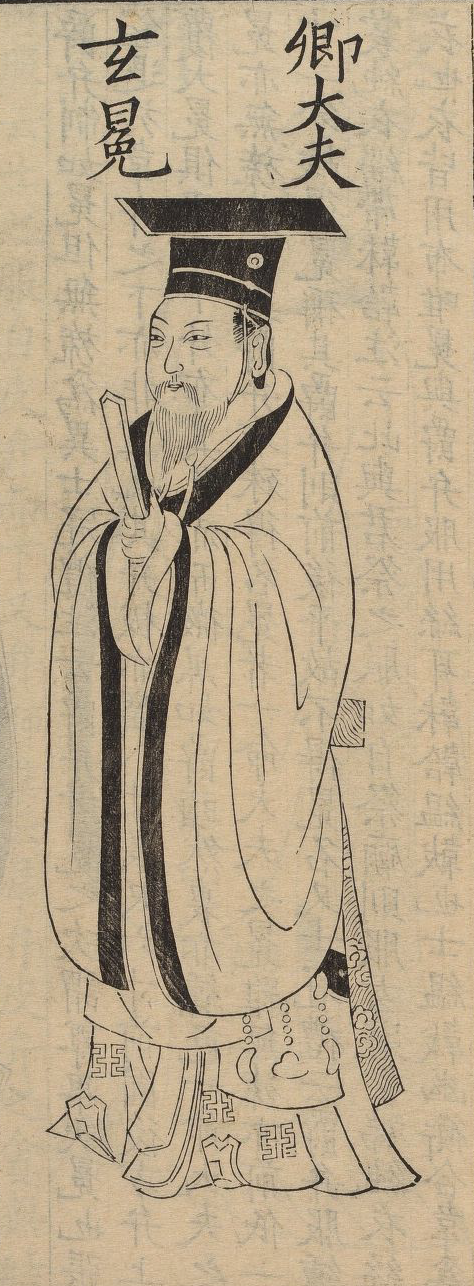
Xuanmian for dafu (大夫)

== History ==
Mianfu was first developed in the Shang dynasty, and later improved and standardized during the Zhou dynasty. The mianfu was also a strict system of attire which was defined based the social rank of its wearer and had to fulfil requirements based on specific events. The mianfu system was developed in the Western Zhou dynasty.

In the Zhou dynasty, there were various types of mianfu; including the gunmian, bimian, cuimian, ximian and xuanmian, which are the five grades of the mianfu worn by the members of the nobility apart from the Emperor; the Zhouli stipulated which types of mianfu were allowed to be worn depending on each noble and official ranks of its wearer:

The dress of dukes (公; gong) resembles that of the emperor at or below the grade of 衮冕; gunmian; the dress of marques (侯; hou) and earls (伯; bo) resembles that of the dukes at or below the grade of bimian (鷩冕); the dress of viscounts (子; zi) and barons (男; nan) resembles that of marques and earls at or below the grade of cuimian (毳冕); the dress of solitaries (孤; gu) resembles that of viscounts and baron at or below the grade of ximian (絺冕); the dress of ministers (卿; qing) and grand masters (大夫; dafu) resembles that of solitaries at or below the grade of xuanmian (玄冕).

— Translated by Zhang Fa (2015), in the book "The History and Spirit of Chinese Art", volume 1, translated from the original text, Zhouli

Though the use of mianfu was abolished during the Qin dynasty, in favour of a black shenyi called junxuan (袀玄) and tongtianguan, which was continued to be used throughout the Western Han dynasty, the mianfu and mianguan were later restored by Emperor Ming of Han in the Eastern Han dynasty based on Rites of Zhou and Confucian Classic of Rites.

In the Song dynasty, the emperor wore mianfu which included daqiumian and gunmian. The crown prince of the Song dynasty also wore gunmian. The rulers of the Jurchen-led Jin dynasty also created their own carriages and apparel system by adopting the clothing system of the Han people and by imitating the Song dynasty; and the Jin emperors wore gunmian. According to the Yuanshi, Möngke wore the gunmian in 1252.

After the Manchu conquerors established the Qing dynasty, the new government initiated a policy that forbade Han Chinese to wear Hanfu. Qing emperors did not use mianfu as the emperor's official garb, which eventually resulted in this style of clothing disappearing from use.

== Influence and derivatives ==
Due to the strong cultural influence China exerted on its neighbours, Mianfu was also worn by rulers in other East Asian countries that belonged to the so-called Sinosphere, such as Korea (in the form of myeonbok), Japan (known as Kon'e) and Vietnam (known as Cổn Miện) during the imperial era.

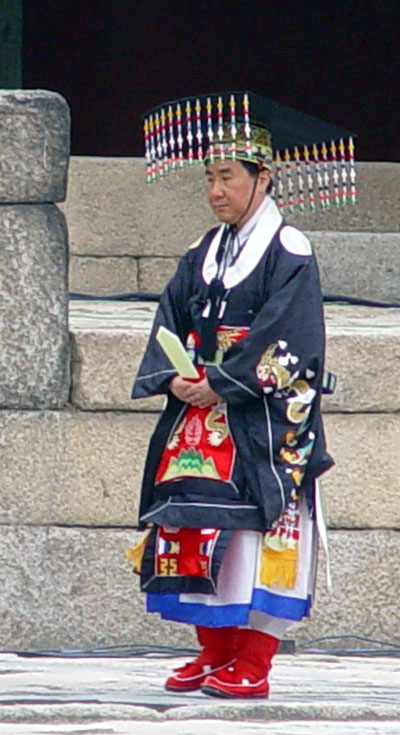
Yi Won wearing myeonbok

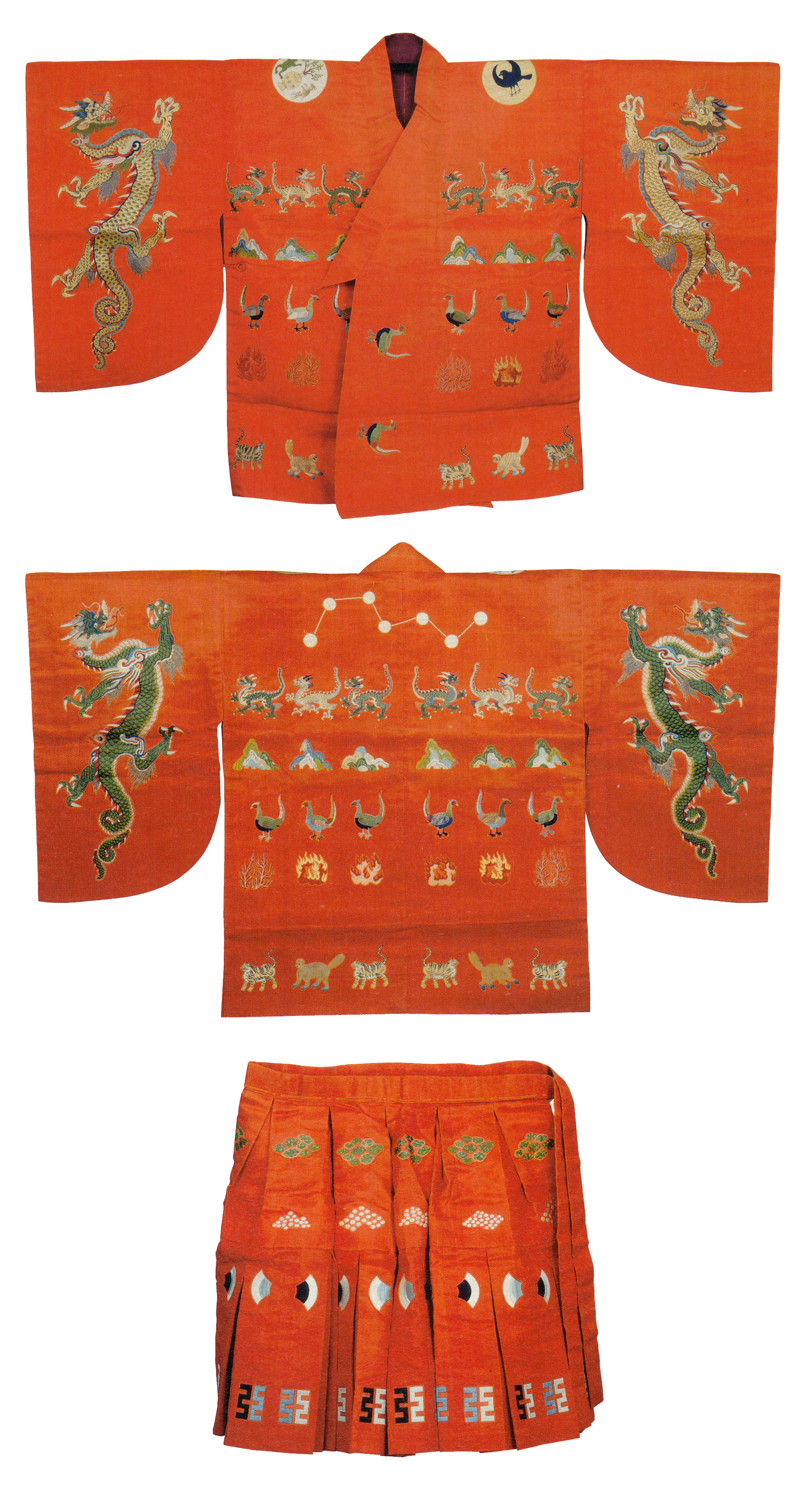
Japan Emperor Kōmei's Kon'e (袞衣)

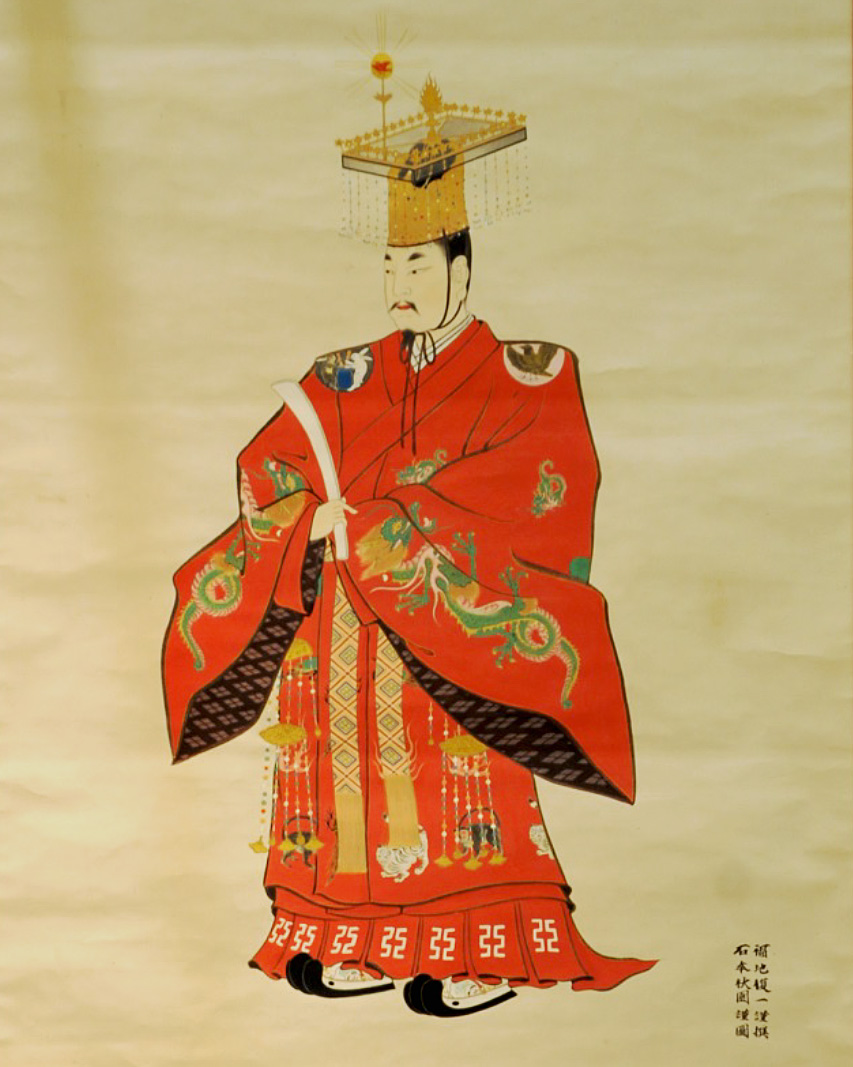
Emperor Go-Sanjō in kon'e (袞衣)

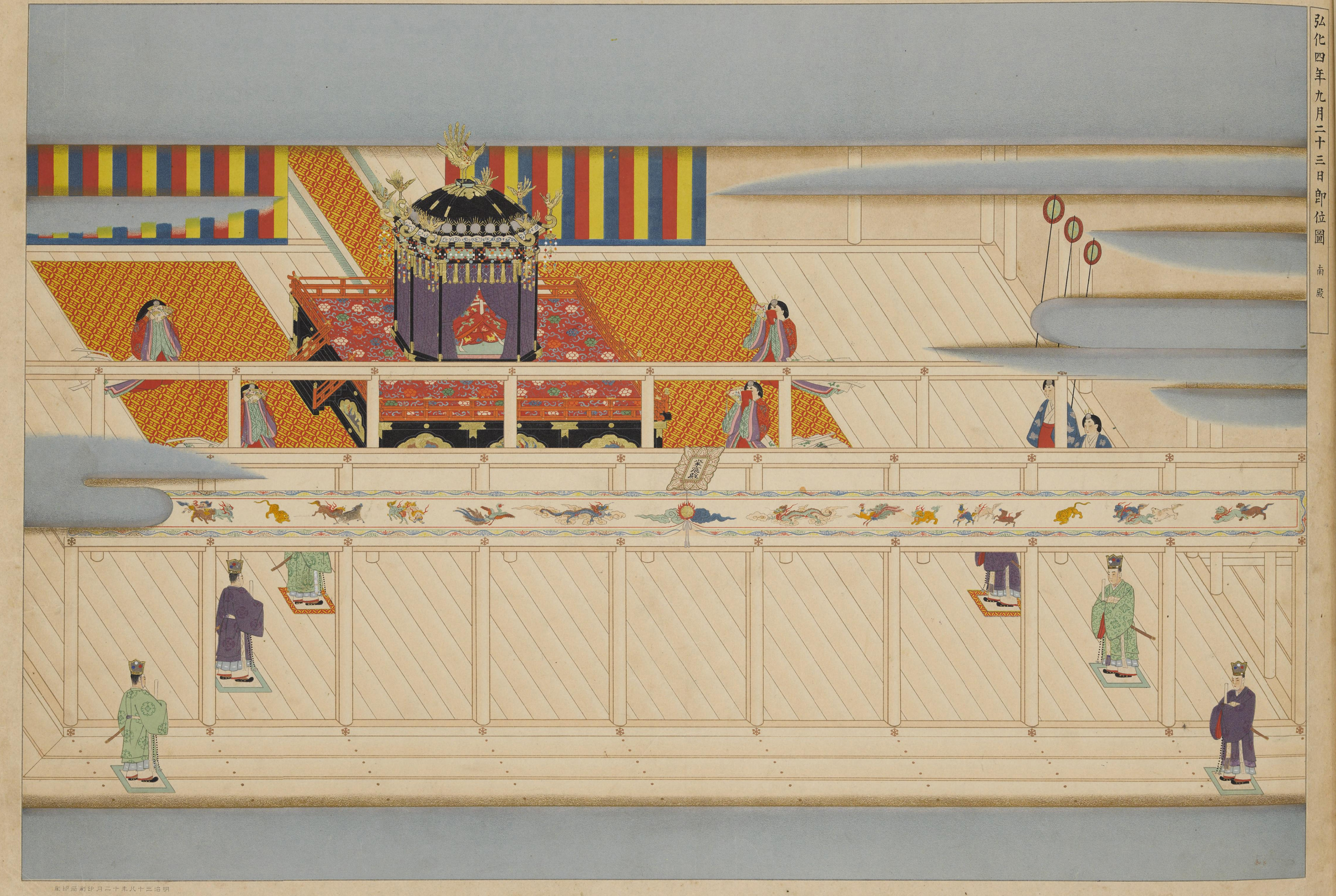
Enthronement ceremony of Emperor Kōmei, kon'e (袞衣) was used as ceremonial clothes.

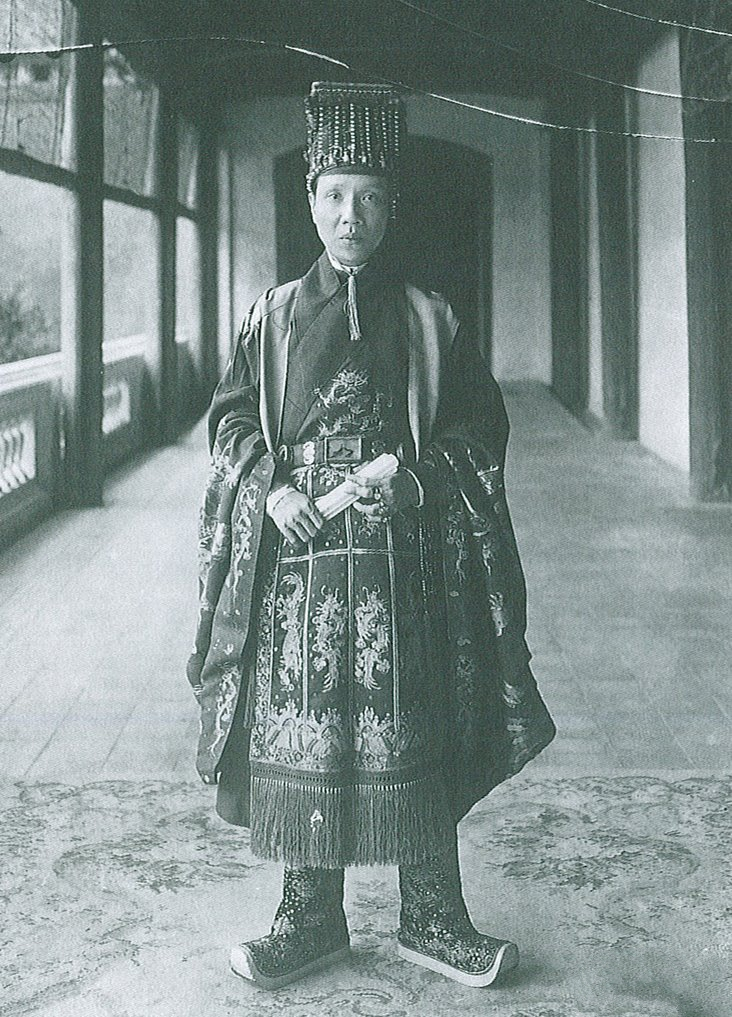
Emperor Khải Định of Vietnam wearing Cổn miện

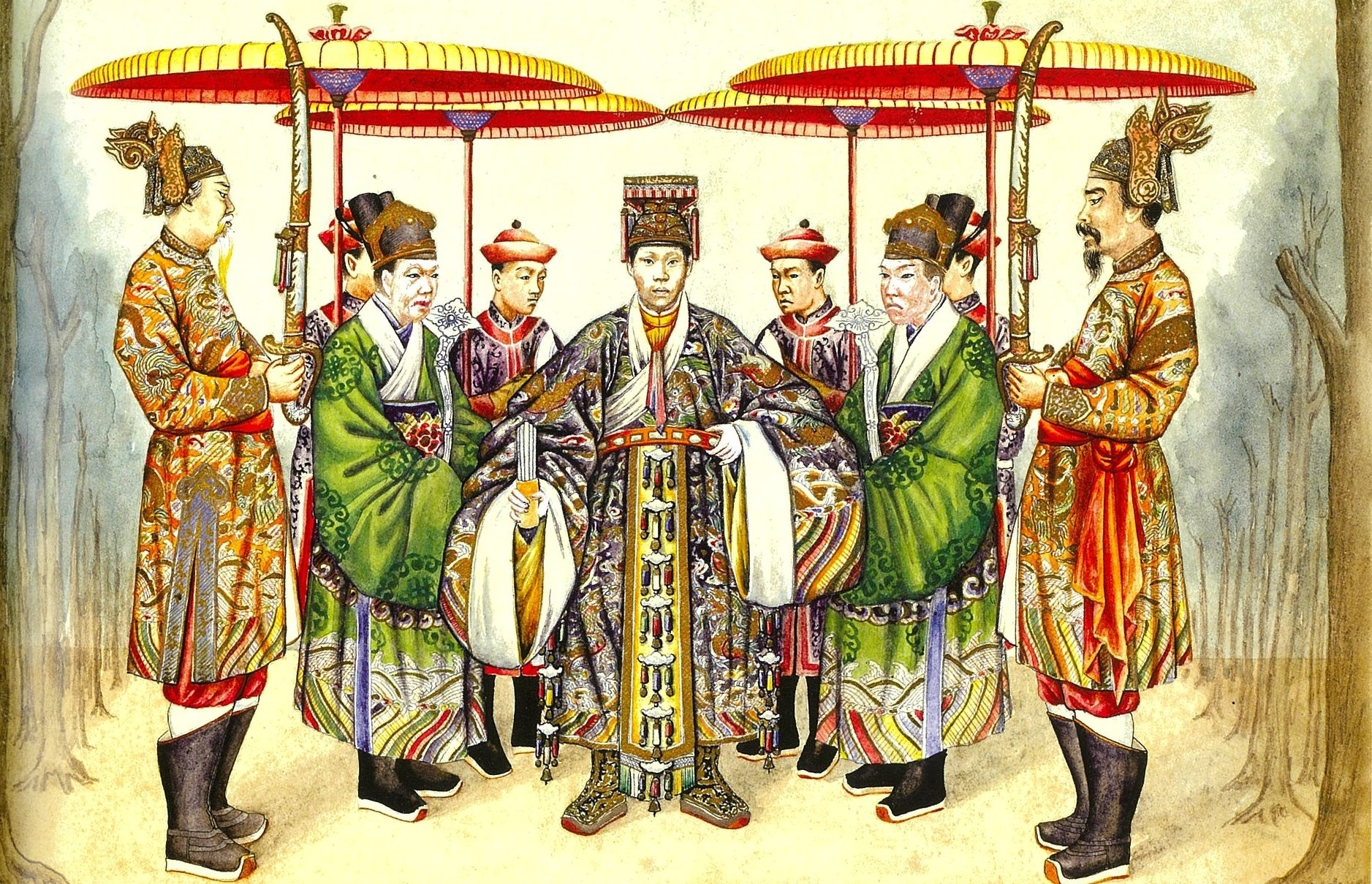
Paintings of Cổn miện costumes in the Nguyễn dynasty by Nguyễn Văn Nhân

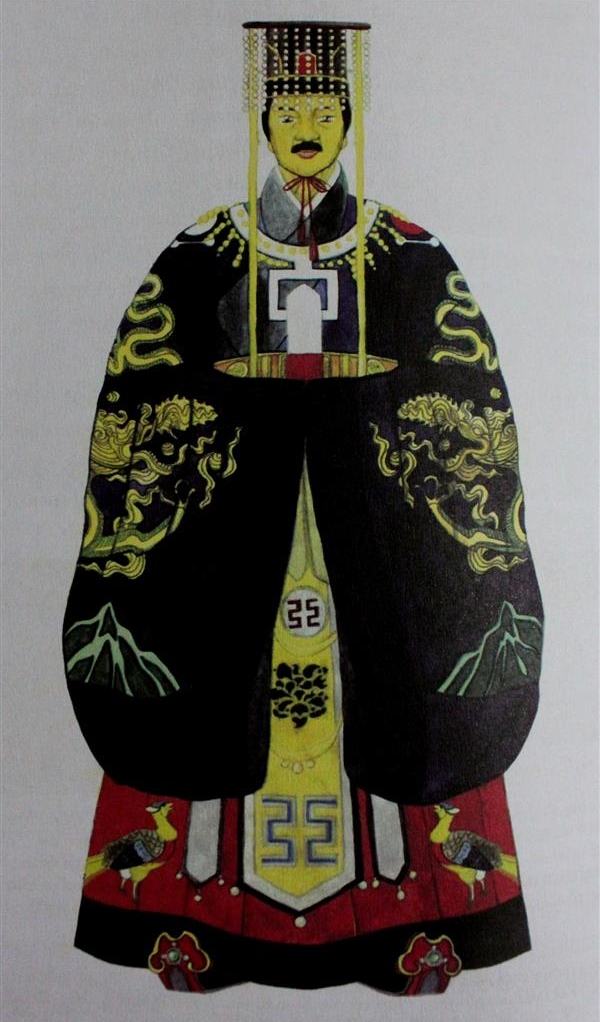
Simulation of Cổn miện of the Lý - Trần dynasties in the book Ngàn năm áo mũ by Trần Quang Đức

== See also ==
- Mianguan
- Bianfu
- Kon'e
- Hanfu
- Twelve Ornaments
