= Yuantaizi Tomb =

Tomb in Chaoyang County, Liaoning, China

The Yuantaizi Tomb (袁台子墓) is located in Yuantaizi village (袁台子村) of the former Shi'ertaiyingzi Township (十二台营子乡), now part of Liucheng subdistrict (柳城街道), Chaoyang County, Liaoning, China. It was found in 1982, and dates back to the early 5th century, corresponding to the latter part of the Eastern Jin period (317–420). The tomb walls and ceilings are plastered and decorated with murals showing hybrid designs from Han Chinese and Murong Xianbei. Chaoyang, formerly Longcheng, was the capital of the Former Yan dynasty (AD 337–370) of the Xianbei.
