= Twelve Ornaments =

Twelve Chinese auspicious ornaments marking power and authority

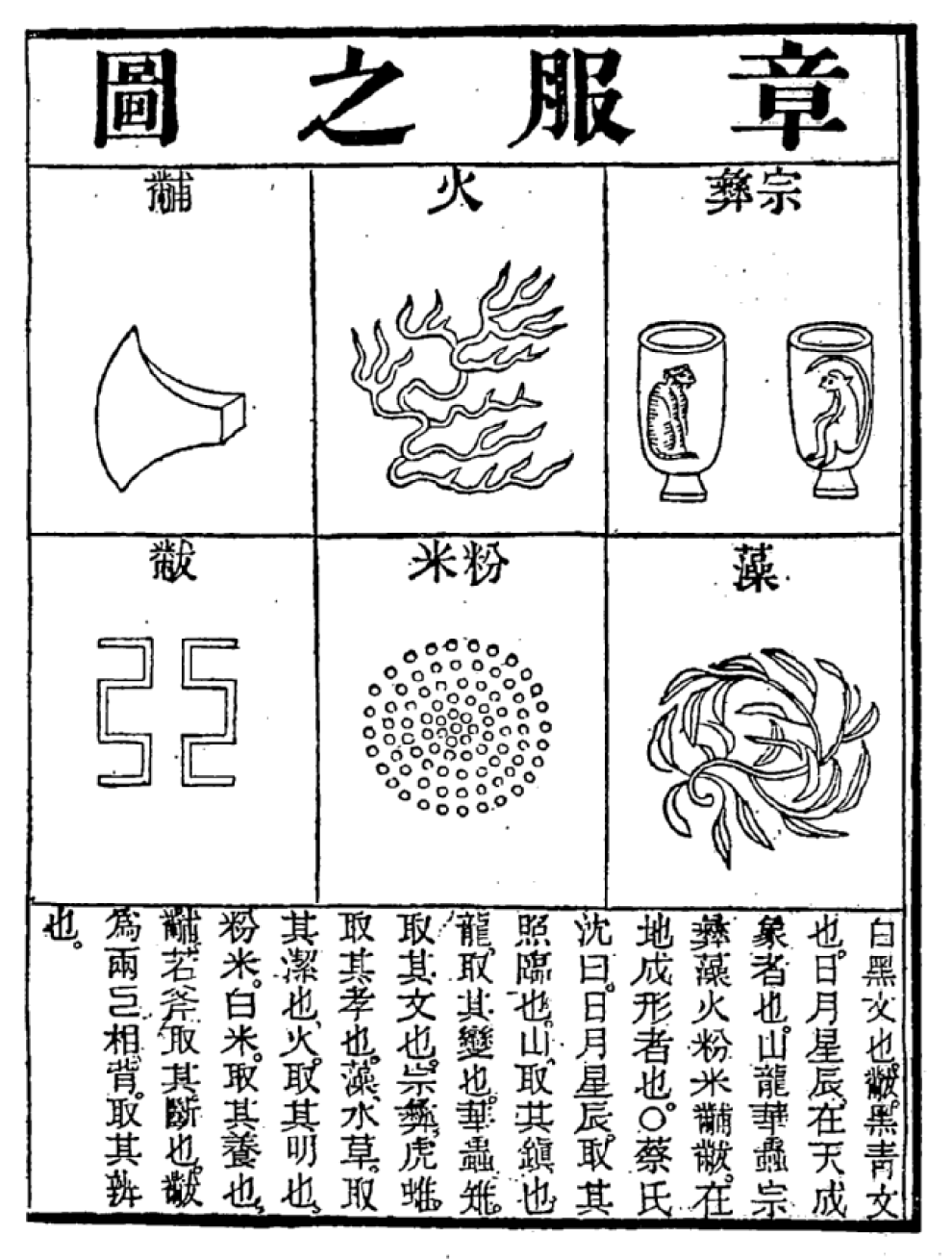
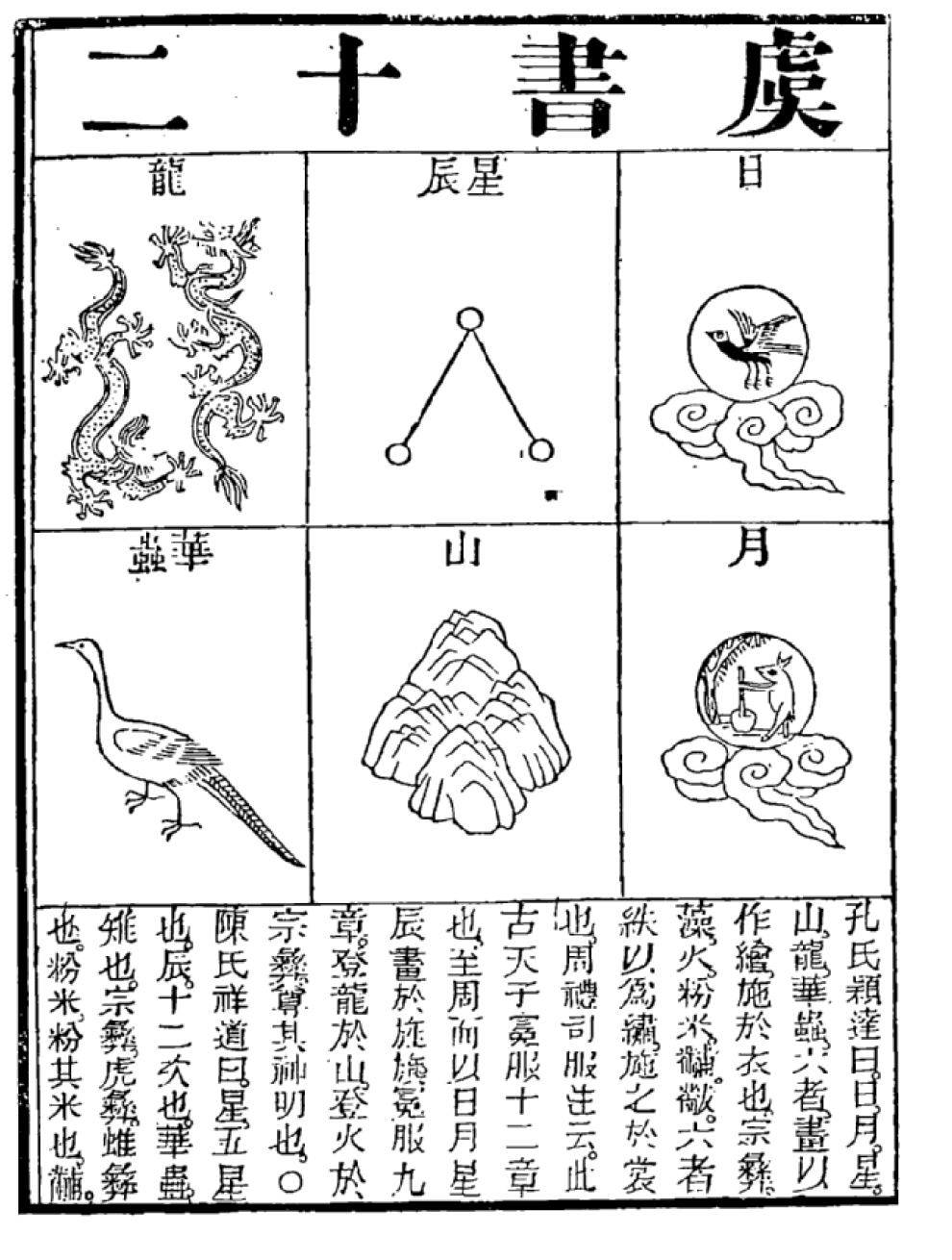
An illustration of the Twelve Ornaments as documented in the Records of the Grand Historian

The Twelve Ornaments (Chinese: 十二章; pinyin: Shí'èr zhāng) are a group of ancient Chinese symbols and designs that are considered highly auspicious. They were employed in the decoration of textile fabrics in ancient China, which signified authority and power, and were embroidered on vestments of state.

== History ==
According to the Book of Documents, the Twelve Ornaments were referred to by Emperor Shun, one of the legendary Three Sovereigns and Five Emperors, as being ancient in his time. Oral tradition holds that he lived sometime between 2294 and 2184 BC. According to the book, the emperor wished for the symbols to be used on official robes of the state.

"I wish," said the Emperor, "to see the emblematic figures of the ancients: the sun, the moon, the stars, the mountain, the dragon, and the flowery fowl, which are depicted on the upper garment; the temple-cup, the aquatic grass, the flames, the grain of rice, the hatchet, and the symbol of distinction, which are embroidered on the lower garment; I wish to see all these displayed with the five colours, so as to form the official robes; it is yours to adjust them clearly." Only the emperor had the right to wear the complete set of twelve emblems painted or embroidered on his robes of ceremony.

When the Twelve ornaments were used in different amounts, it could denote different social ranks; for example, in 59 AD during the Eastern Han dynasty, it was specified that the 12 ornaments concerning the sun, the moon and the star had to be used for the emperors while 9 ornaments concerning mountains and dragons should be used by the 3 councillors, dukes and princes. The 9 ministers and the lower-ranking officials had to use 7 ornaments concerning pheasants.

The twelve ornaments featured in the Twelve Symbols national emblem of China, which was the state emblem from 1913 to 1928.

== Symbols ==
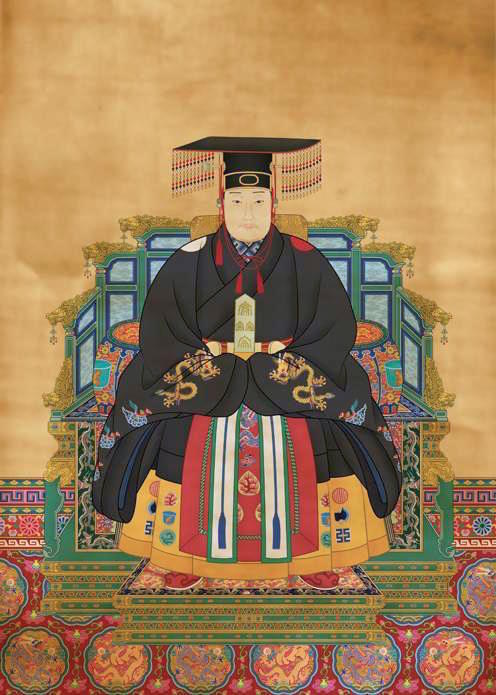
Portrait of the Wanli Emperor's mianfu featuring the twelve ornaments

The "twelve symbols" were used as insignia for reigning emperors, empress and the immediate members of the imperial family.

The portrait of the Wanli Emperor (1563–1620) in his mianfu features all twelve ornaments:

=== On the upper Robe ===
- the sun (日; rì) with the three-legged crow
- the moon (月; yuè) with the moon rabbit in it, who is constantly pounding the elixir of life
- the three stars (星辰; xīngchén), which could also be the Fu Lu Shou stars, which symbolise happiness, prosperity, and longevity
- the sacred mountains (山; shān), which symbolize stability and tranquility
- the dragon (龍; lóng), symbol of adaptability and strength
- the pheasant (華蟲), which is however the phoenix (鳳凰; fenghuang), symbol of peace and refinement

The dragon and phoenix represent the natural world. In yin and yang terminology, a dragon is male yang and the phoenix a female yin. Therefore, the emperor was often identified as the dragon, while the empress was the phoenix. This was also reflected in the robes they wore.

Twelve Symbols national emblem, the state emblem of China from 1913 to 1928

=== On the lower robe ===
- two cups (宗彝; zōng yí), which are a sacrificial utensil, sometimes feature patterns containing each a tiger and a monkey, and symbolize faithfulness and respect
- a spray of pondweed or algae (藻; zǎo), a symbol of brightness and purity
- fire (火; huǒ), which symbolises brightness.
- grains of rice (粉米; fěn mǐ), which symbolises nourishment and the country's agriculture, but also wealth
- an axe (黼; fǔ), symbol of courage and resolution, but also executive justice.
- The figure 亞 (黻; fú) underneath the axe represents two animals with their backside together. This symbolises the capability to make a clear distinction between right and wrong.

== Influences ==
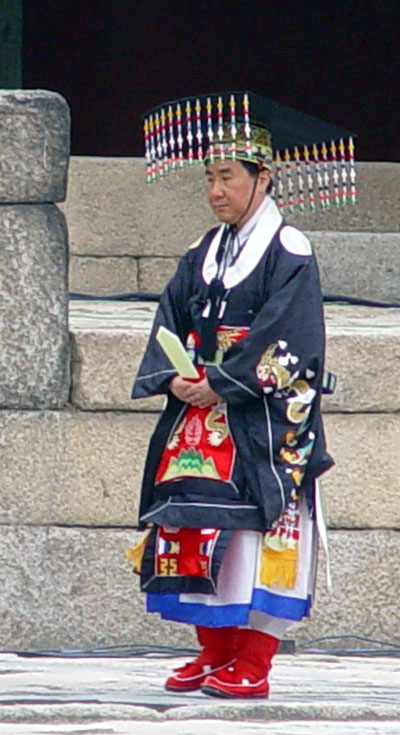
Yi Won, presiding at the 2008 Jongmyo Daejae, wearing myeonbok with the Twelve Symbols on it. He is also wearing a meyollugwan (headpiece) with twelve chains both at the front and back.

In Japan, Emperor Monmu introduced the Twelve Ornaments via Taihō Code.

Gojong of Korea used the Twelve Ornaments on his enthronement costume (i.e. myeonbok, 면복/冕服) when he proclaimed himself Emperor of Korea in 1897 which followed the dress system of ancient China. In the myeonbok of Korean Kings could only use 9 symbols (i.e. gujanbok, nine-emblem myeonbok) instead of the 12 as only the Chinese Emperor could wear the twelve ornaments. It is only after Gojong proclaimed the Korean Empire, equal to China, that he was allowed to wear the 12 symbols.

The meyonbok, featuring the Twelve Symbols, continue to be used in the Korean imperial household's Jongmyo Daejae ancestor-worship ceremony.

Otherwise nowadays, these embroidered Chinese symbols lost most of their significance and are mostly used to decorate clothing. Some of these Chinese symbols were also adopted in Western fashions, such as T-shirts and tattoos.

== See also ==
- Ashtamangala: The eight Buddhist treasures
- Bagua: The eight Taoist symbols
- Imperial Regalia of Japan: The three treasures of Japan
- Three Heavenly Seals: The three treasures of Korea
