= Myeonbok =

Ceremonial clothing of Joseon Kings

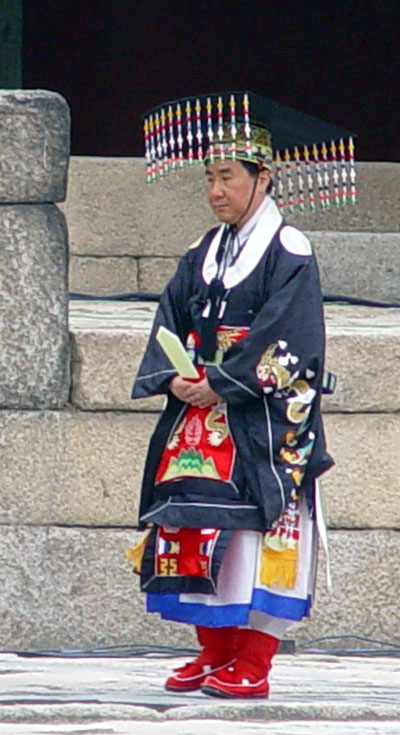
Myeonbok

Myeonbok is a kind of ceremonial clothing worn by the kings of Joseon Dynasty (1392–1910) in Korea. Myeonbok was adopted from Chinese Mianfu, and is worn by kings at special events such as the coronation, morning audience, Lunar New Year's audience, ancestral rites at Jongmyo and the soil and grain rite at Sajikdan. Myeonbok symbolizes the dignity of king when conducting important ceremonies.

== Types of myeonbok ==
Myeonbok is divided into gujangbok and sibijangbok. Gujangbok (nine-emblem myeonbok) is worn by king and sibijangbok (twelve-emblem myeonbok) is worn by emperor. The myeonbok of Korean Kings could only use nine symbols instead of the Twelve Ornaments as only the Emperor (typically Chinese Emperors) could wear the Twelve Ornaments. The Korean kings have used the nine symbols since the year 1065 AD after the Liao emperor had bestowed a nine-symbol robe (Chinese: 九章衣; pinyin: jiǔzhāngyī; gujangbok) to the Korean king in 1043 AD.

The myeonbok is worn with seok (shoes worn for rituals); the seok also originated from China before developing further into a unique Korean style.

== History ==
In early Joseon, King Taejong attempted to develop positive relationship with China's Ming dynasty; this positive political orientation towards Ming dynasty China lead to the formal recognition of Joseon and the inauguration of King Taejong as the King of Joseon, along with the bestowal of the Mianfu.

Gojong of Korea appropriated the Twelve Ornaments on his enthronement costume (i.e. myeonbok, 면복/冕服) when he became the Emperor of Korea in 1897 which followed the dress system of ancient China.

Out of the occasions where myeonbok would have been worn, the ancestral rites at Jongmyo and the soil and grain rite at Sajikdan continue into the 21st century, where the Hereditary Prince Imperial, wearing the 12-ornamented myeonbok, presides in place of the Emperor.

== See also ==
- Mianfu
- Jeogori
- Po
- Wonsam
- Hwarot
