= Bixi (clothing) =

Traditional Chinese knee covering

- Illustration of a bixi found in the Chinese encyclopedia Gujin Tushu Jicheng, section "Ceremonial Usages", between 1700 and 1725 AD.

Chinese name
- Chinese: 蔽膝
- Literal meaning: Knee cover
Transcriptions
Standard Mandarin
- Hanyu Pinyin: bìxī

Alternative Chinese name
- Chinese: 韍
- Literal meaning: Kneepad
Transcriptions
Standard Mandarin
- Hanyu Pinyin: Fú

Korean name
- Hangul: 폐슬
- Hanja: 蔽膝
Transcriptions
- Revised Romanization: Pyeseul

Bixi (Chinese: 蔽膝; pinyin: bìxī; lit. 'Cover knee'; Korean: 폐슬; Hanja: 蔽膝; RR: Pyeseul), also known as fu (Chinese: 韍; lit. 'kneepad'), is generic term which refers to a type of traditional Chinese decorative piece of fabric, which acts as a knee covering, in Hanfu. The bixi originated in China where it originated from the primitive clothing of the ancient; since then, it continued to be worn by both men and women, and eventually became part of the Chinese ceremonial attire. The bixi was later introduced in Korea during Goryeo and Joseon by the Ming dynasty, along with many garments for royalties.

== History ==
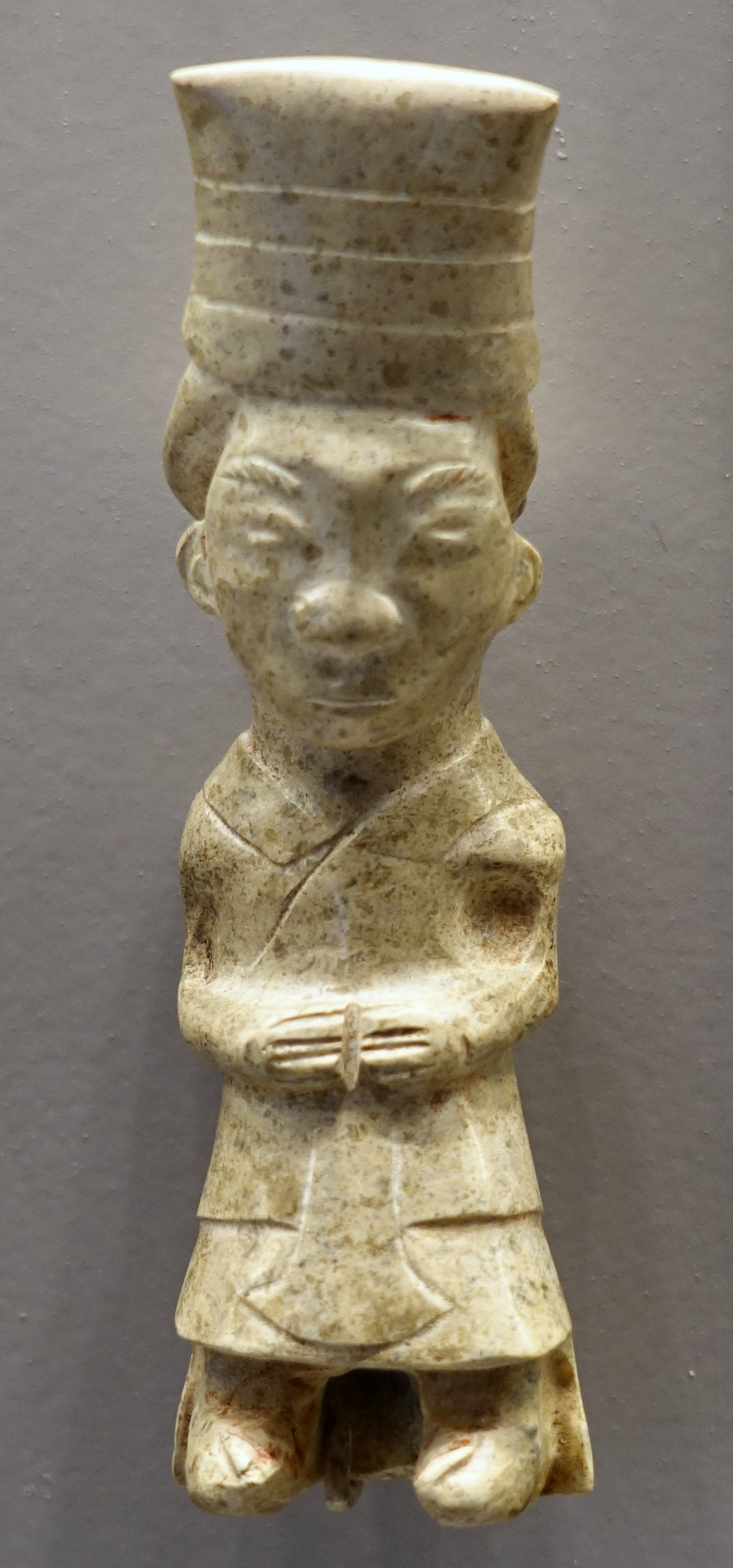
A Standing dignitary wearing a bixi over his yichang, Shang dynasty, 12th-11th century BC.

The bixi originated from primitive clothing back when animal hides were used to replace foreskin and the genitals.

During the Shang dynasty, the basic style of clothing for men and women consisted of yichang and bixi.

Among many other types of female clothing items, the bixi was listed in tomb inventories dating from 361 AD.

In the Ming dynasty, the bixibecame part of the official clothing.

== Construction and design ==
The bixi is a length of fabric which is typically long enough to reach the kneel-level and cover the front legs when attached to the waist of its wearer.

== Usage ==
=== Male clothing attire ===
A red bixi was worn as part of the mianfu which was worn by the Chinese emperors.

A crimson bixi was worn as part of the tongtianguanfu.

Bixi in court and ceremonial attire

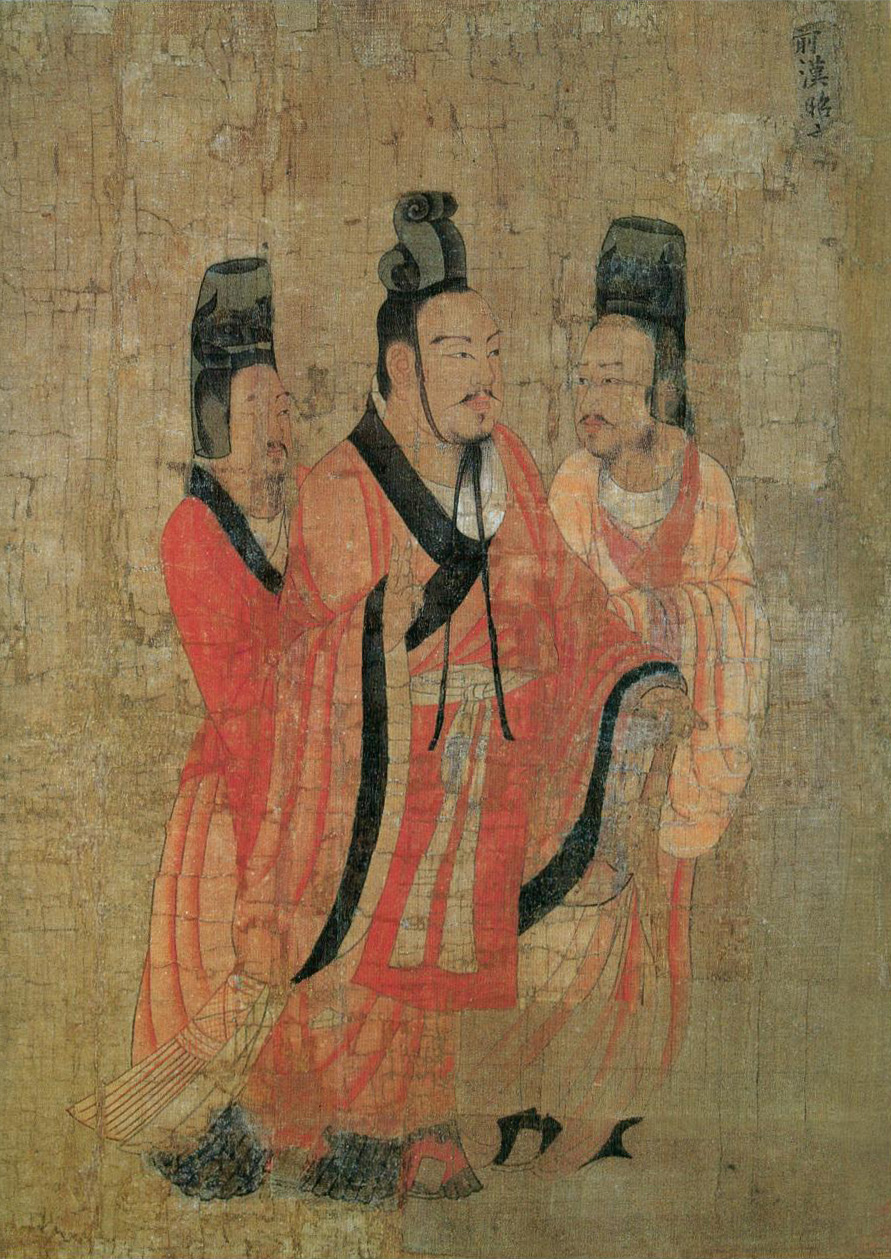
Emperor Zhao of Han with a red bixi.

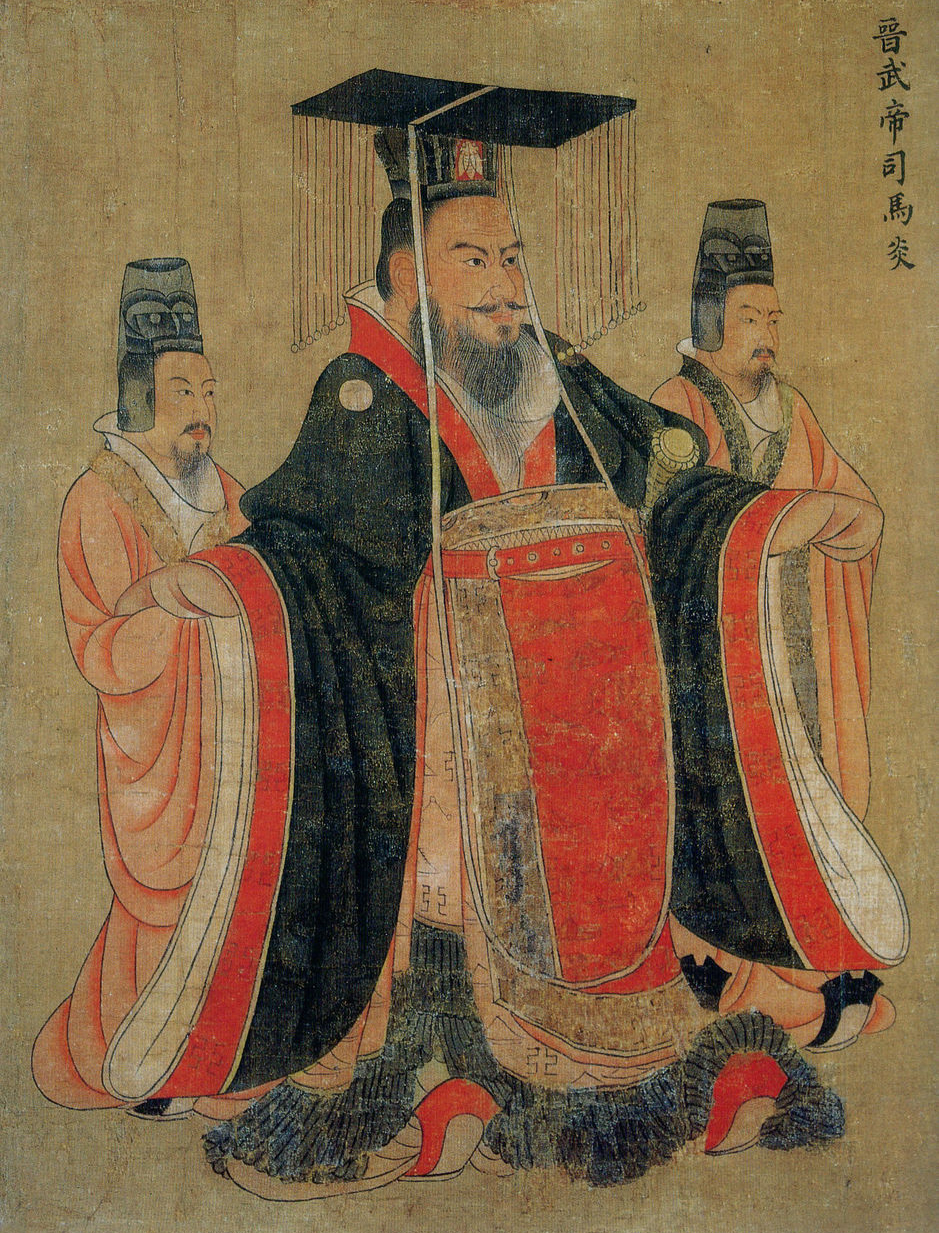
Emperor Wu of Jin dynasty wearing mianfu with a red bixi.

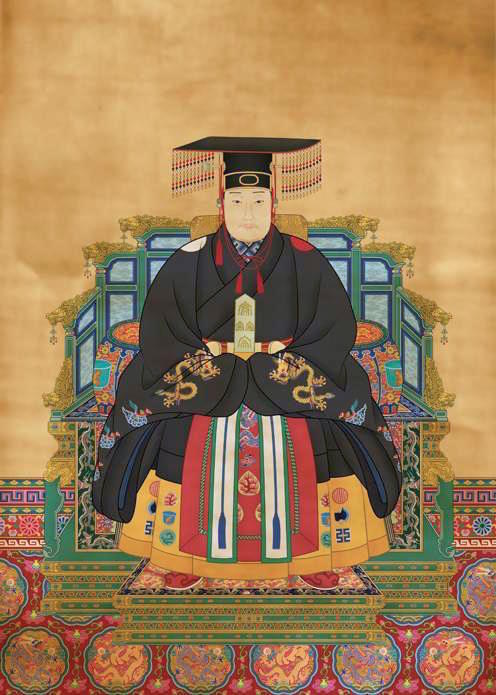
Wanli Emperor wearing a red bixi as part of the mianfu, Ming dynasty.

Emperor Xuanzu of Song wearing tongtianguanfu with a crimson bixi.

=== Female clothing attire ===
A bixi was also worn with the diyi worn by Chinese empresses; the bixi worn in the diyi hanged in front of the garment and had the same colour as the bottom colour as the lower skirt.

Bixi in court and ceremonial attire

Song dynasty empress wearing diyi with a bixi.

== See also ==
- Hanfu
- List of Hanfu
- Mianfu
