= Tanling ruqun =

Traditional Chinese woman's costume

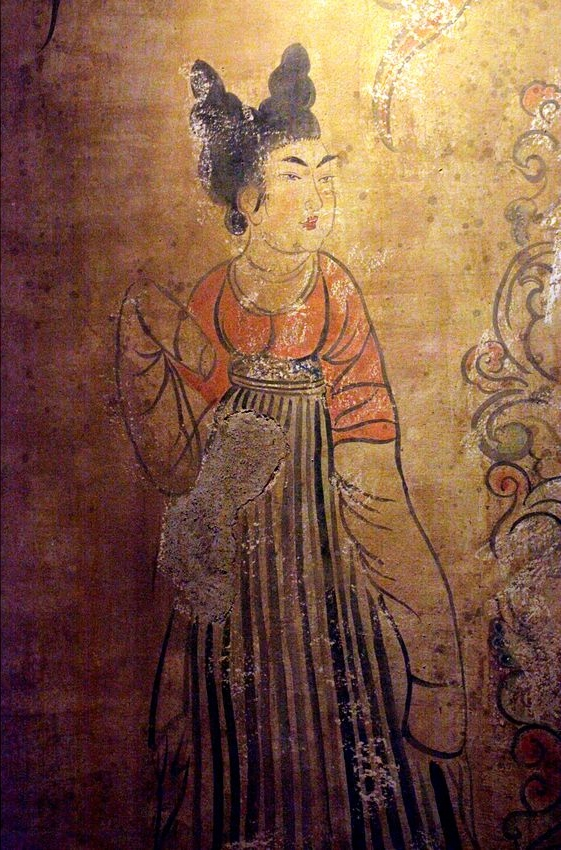
- Maid wearing tanling ruqun and pipo, mural from the tomb of Wei Guifei (韋貴妃), Tang dynasty

Chinese name
- Chinese: 坦领襦裙
- Literal meaning: Flat (or open-hearted) collar jacket skirt
Transcriptions
Standard Mandarin
- Hanyu Pinyin: Tǎnlǐng rúqún

English name
- English: Tan collar ruqun/ U-collar ruqun

Tanling ruqun (Chinese: 坦領襦裙; pinyin: Tǎnlǐng rúqún; lit. 'Flat (or open-hearted) collar jacket skirt'), also known as Tan collar ruqun and U-collar ruqun, is a type of Hanfu which was developed under the influence of Hufu (most likely influenced by Qiuci); it is a form a kind of ruqun which typically consists of three parts, featuring a low-cut low-cut U-shaped collar upper inner garment with long sleeves, a U-shaped collar banbi upper outer garment with short sleeves, a long high-waisted skirt. It can also be adorned with a shawl, called pipo (披帛). It was a popular form of clothing attire in the Sui and Tang dynasty. In the 21st century, the Tanling ruqun re-appeared as a result of the Hanfu movement. The 21st century Tanling ruqun was developed by reproducing the original patterns of the historical tanling ruqun while being aligned with modern aesthetics.

== Terminology ==
The term tanling ruqun is composed of the terms tanling and ruqun. Tǎnlǐng (坦领) refers to the U-shaped (坦; tǎn; 'flat collar/ open-hearted') collar (领; lǐng) of the upper garment, typically specifically referring to the U-shaped banbi which is worn as an outer upper garment. The term ruqun refers to the traditional two piece attire of the ancient Han Chinese consisting of a skirt and an upper garment called ru.

== Construction and design ==
The tanling ruqun is mainly composed three parts: a long wrap skirt, a U-shaped collar inner shirt with long sleeves, and a tanling banbi (a U-shaped short sleeves outer jacket).

Unearthed artefacts dating in the Tang dynasty, such as sculptures and paintings show that the long-sleeves, low-cut inner shirt could be tucked under the long (high-waisted) skirts.The skirts could be embellished with stripe patterns of two colours or be found in monochrome colours. The banbi falls above the waistor were waist-length, and they could be embellished with embroidered borders at the wrist. The banbi could also be tucked under or worn over the long skirt. The tanling ruqun can also be worn together with a shawl, called pipo (披帛), around the arms or the shoulders of its wearer; they could also wear it together with variety of hats.In the Tang dynasty, hats of foreign origins or influence, such as the mili, weimao and humao, were worn when horseback riding.

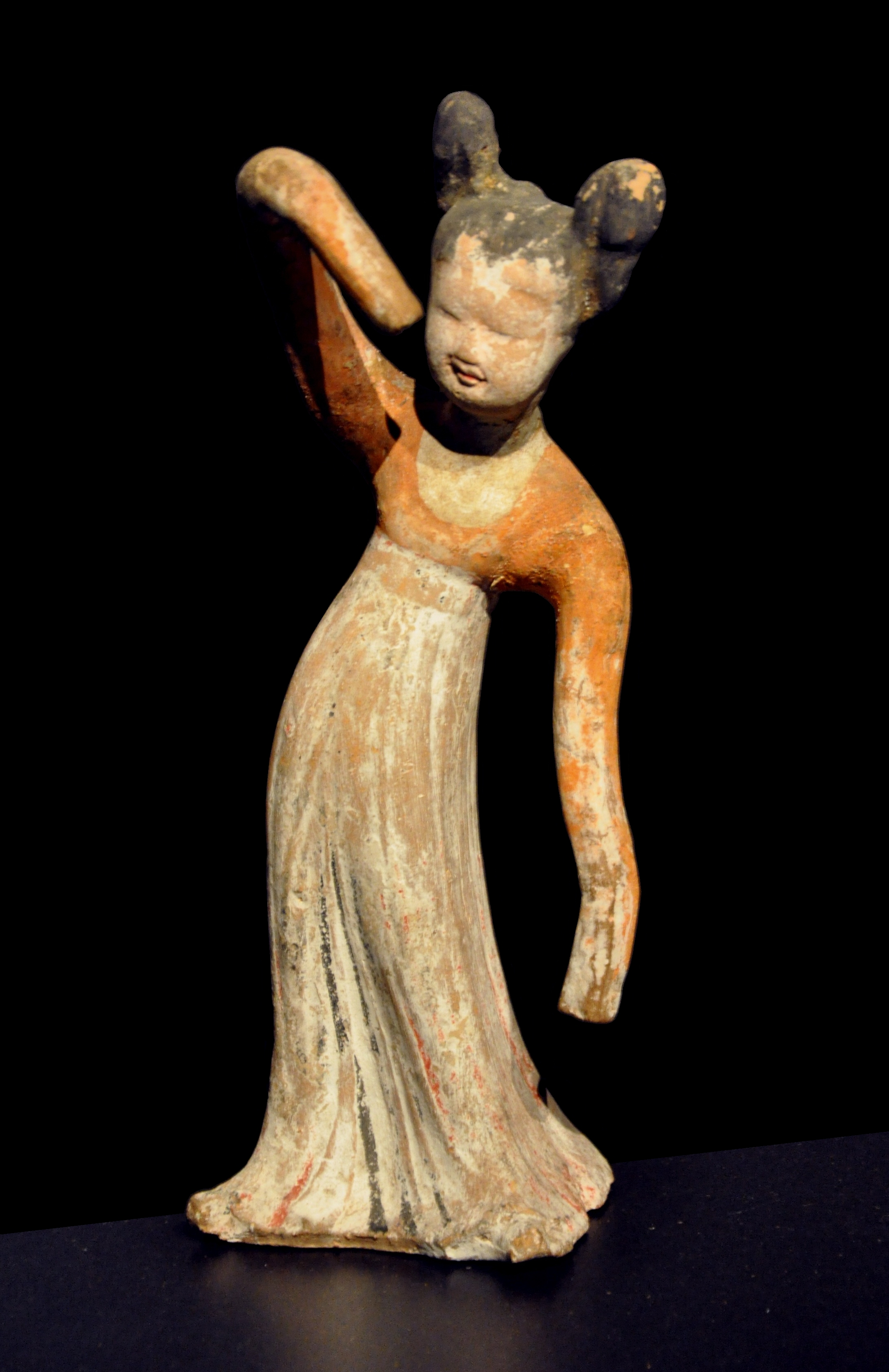
Tang dynasty female sculpture wearing a low cut, U-shaped collar shirt with long sleeves without the tanling banbi

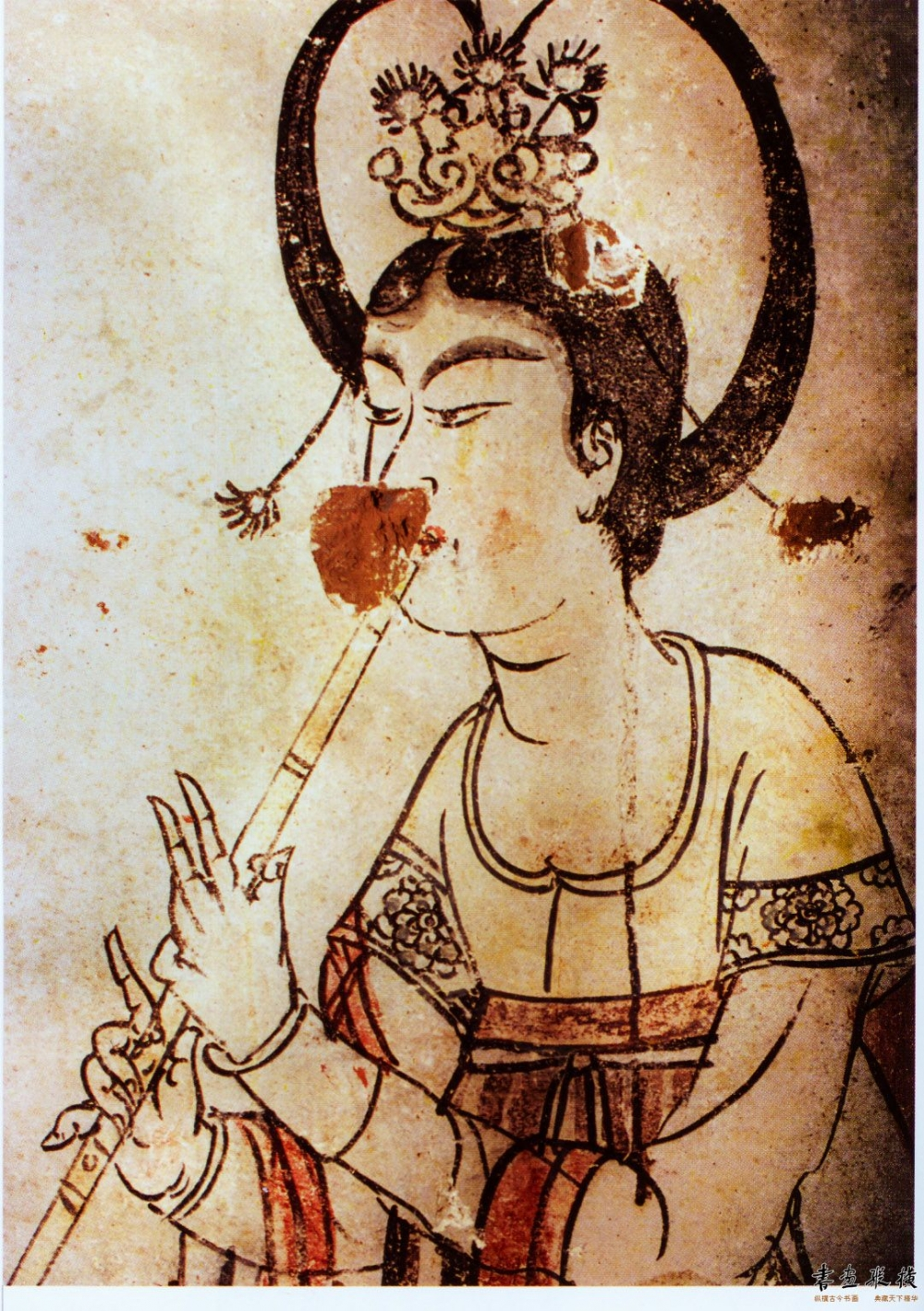
Detailed of a Tang dynasty woman wearing a tanling banbi under a skirt. There is embroidered borders at the sleeves of the banbi.

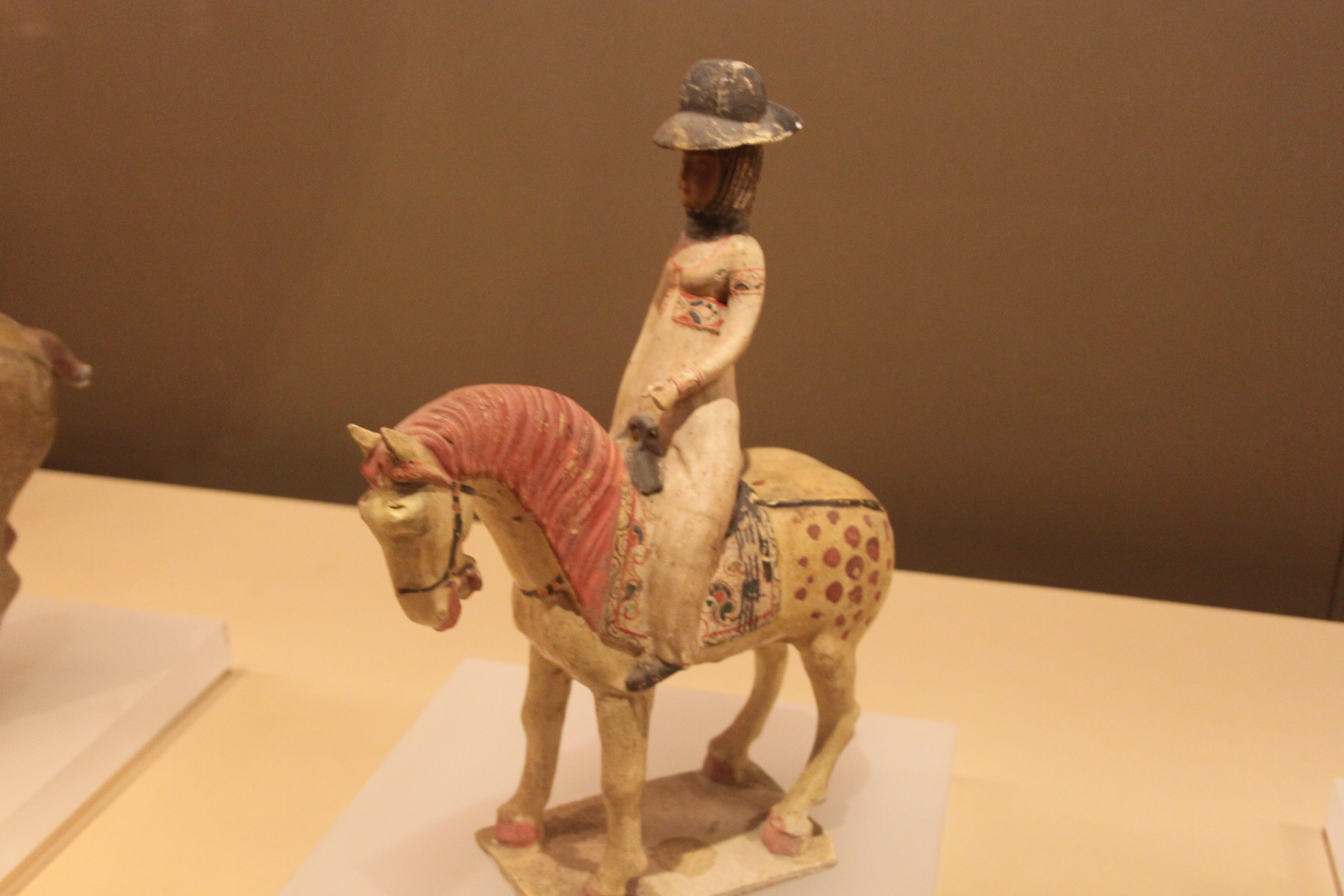
Woman rider wearing a tanling ruqun and a humao, Horse and female rider, Tang dynasty.

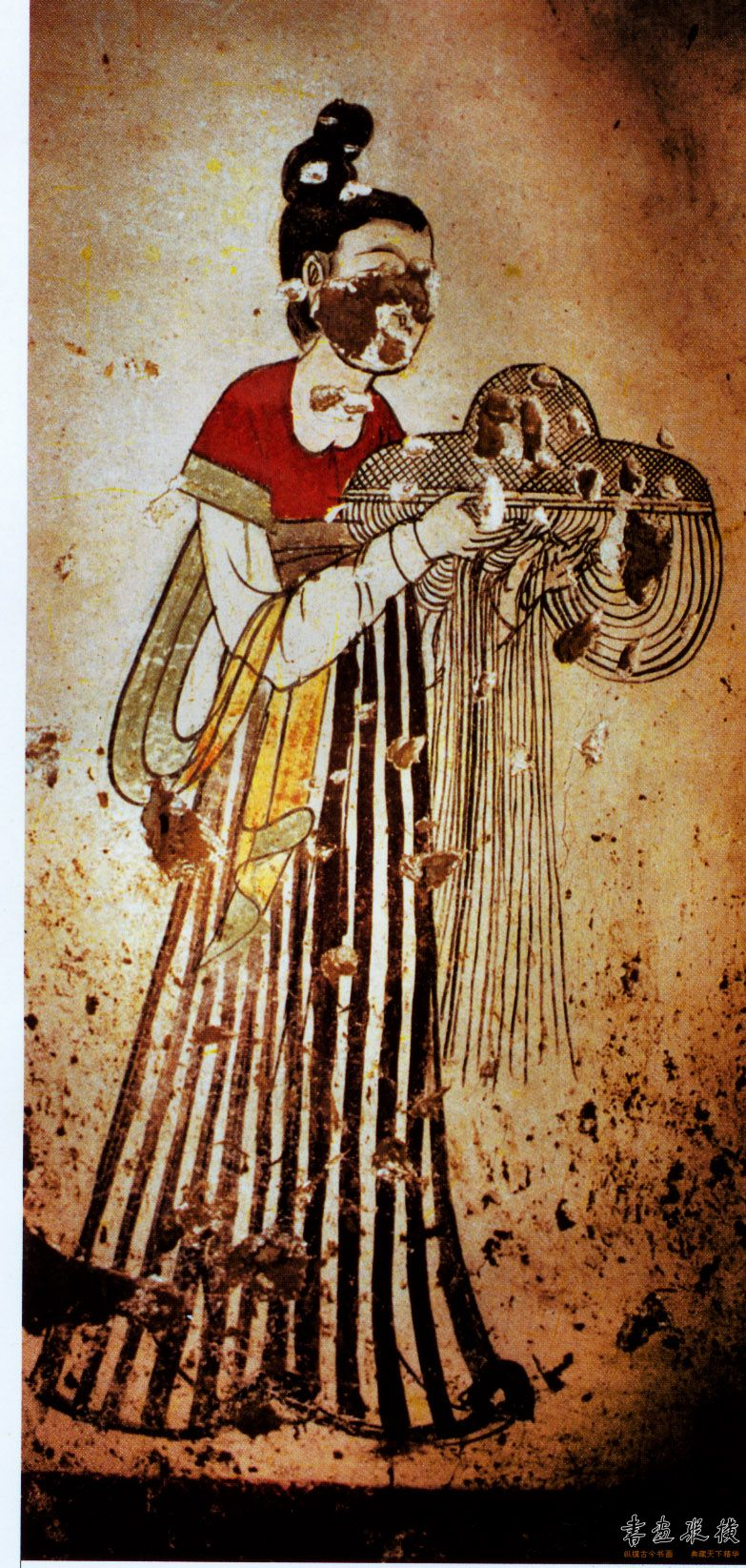
Tang dynasty woman wearing a tanling ruqun and pibo (shawl), she is holding a mili.

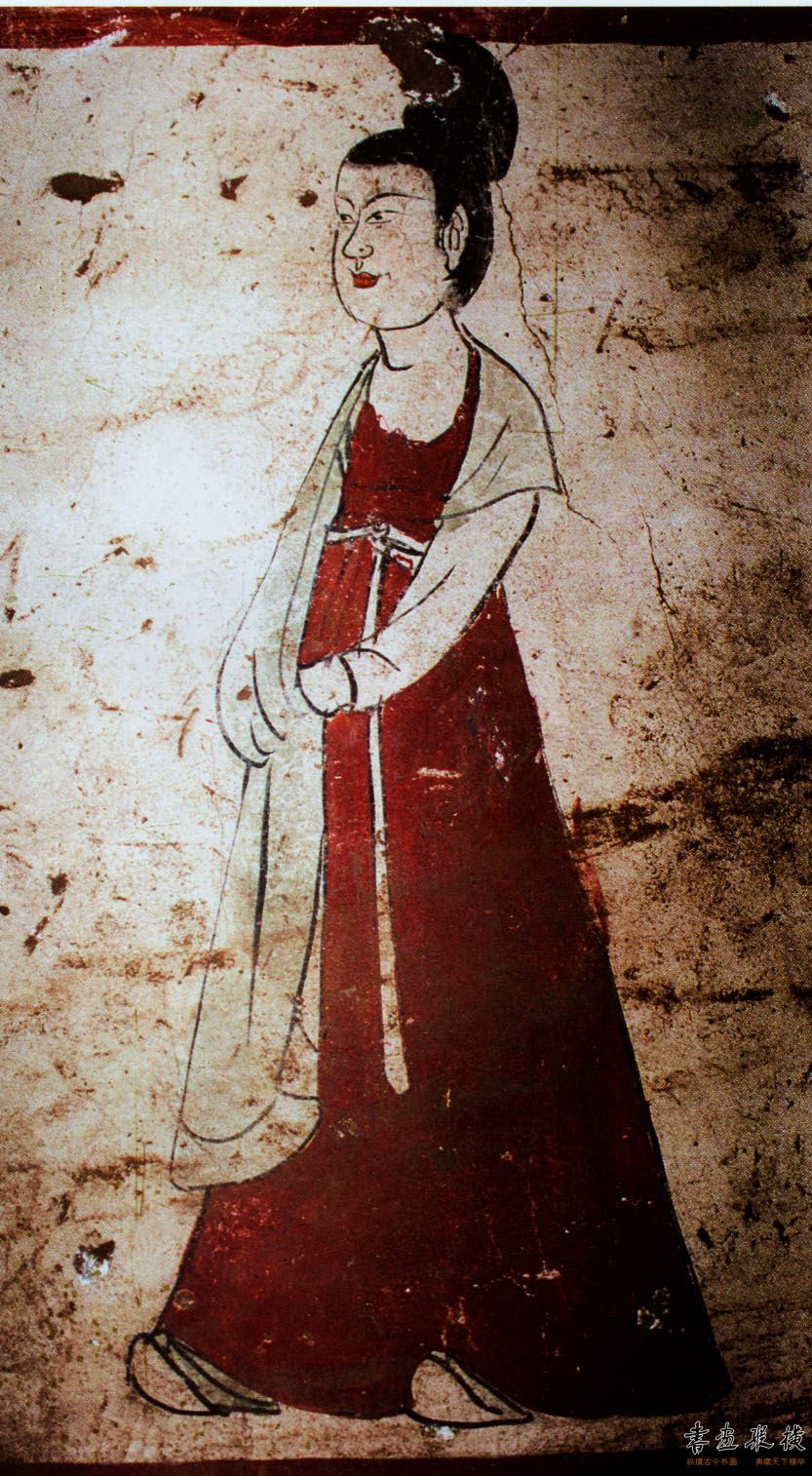
A maid wearing tanling ruqun with pipo over the shoulders, mural from the tomb of Yanfei (燕妃), Tang dynasty.

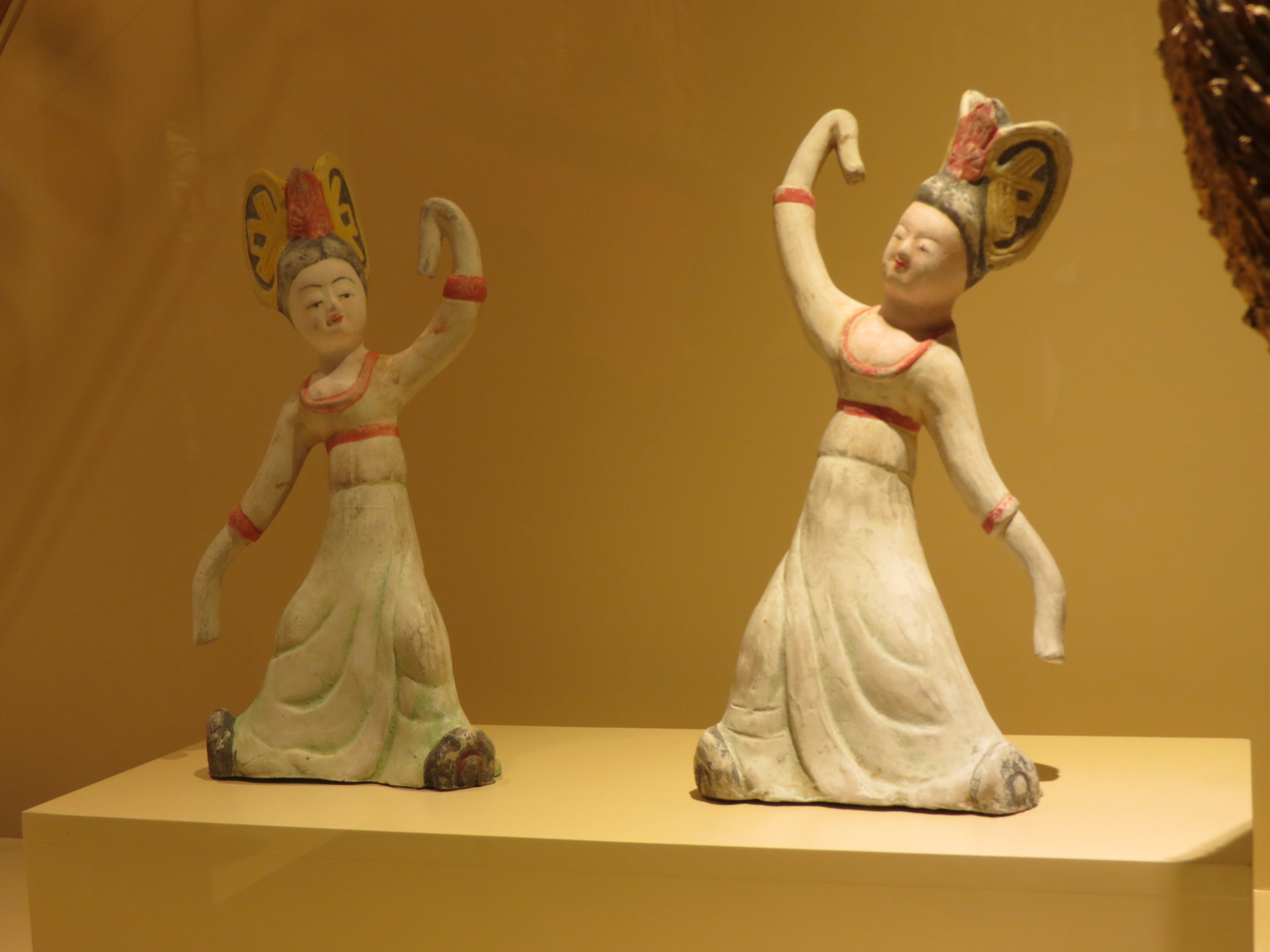

== History ==
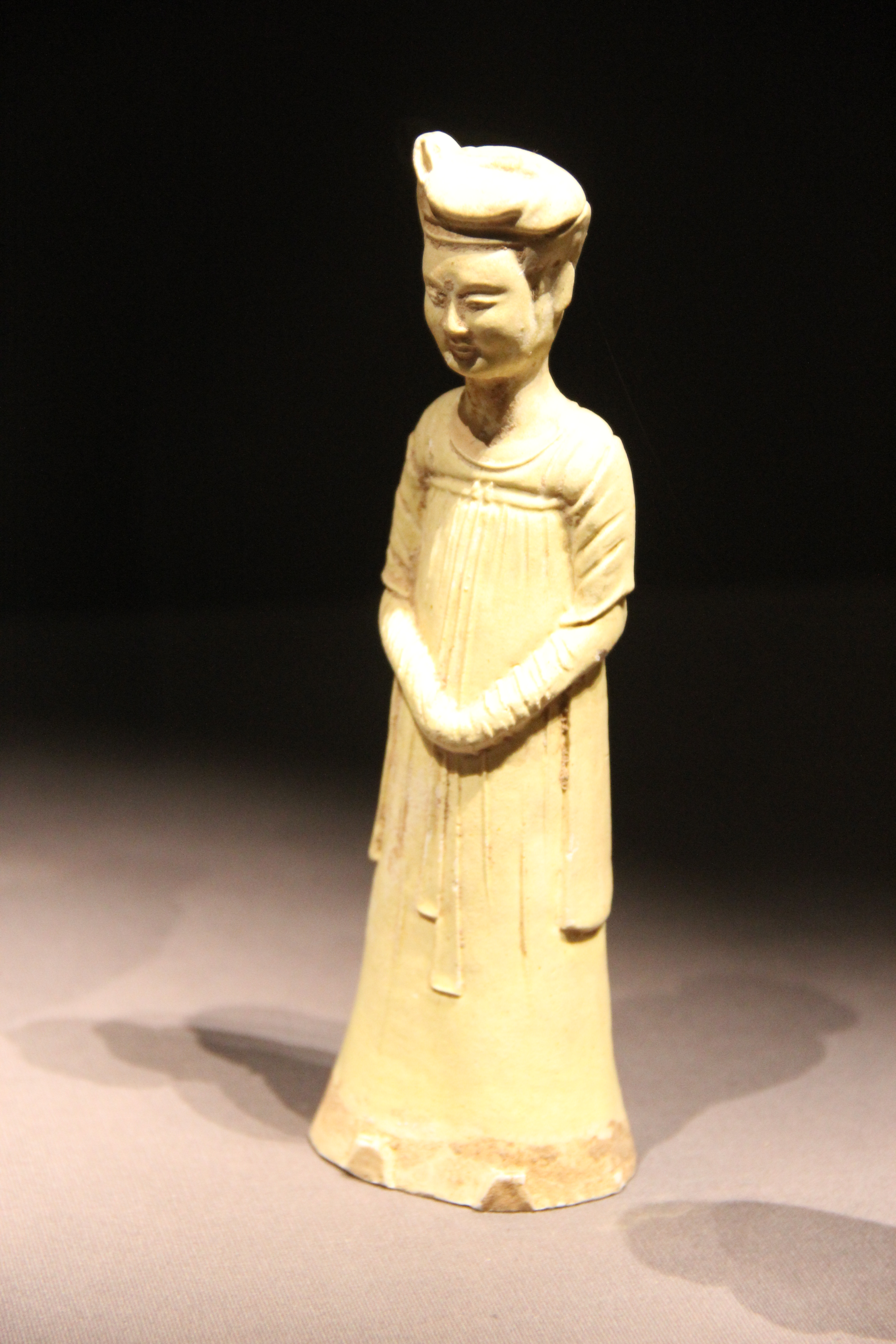
Female attendant wearing a tanling blouse and skirt, Sui dynasty

The late sixth century, for example in the Sui dynasty, was marked the arrival of new style of women's Hanfu. The new style of clothing had high waisted skirt almost similar to the Empire silhouette and the upper garments had low décolletage. The Sui dynasty women already liked wearing banbi over their long-sleeved clothing. Tanling garments, including the tanling banbi, was already popular in the court of the early Sui dynasty, the predecessor of the Tang dynasty. The Tang dynasty continued the clothing style of its predecessor, and women continued to wear high-waisted skirt, low-cut upper garments and long skirts.

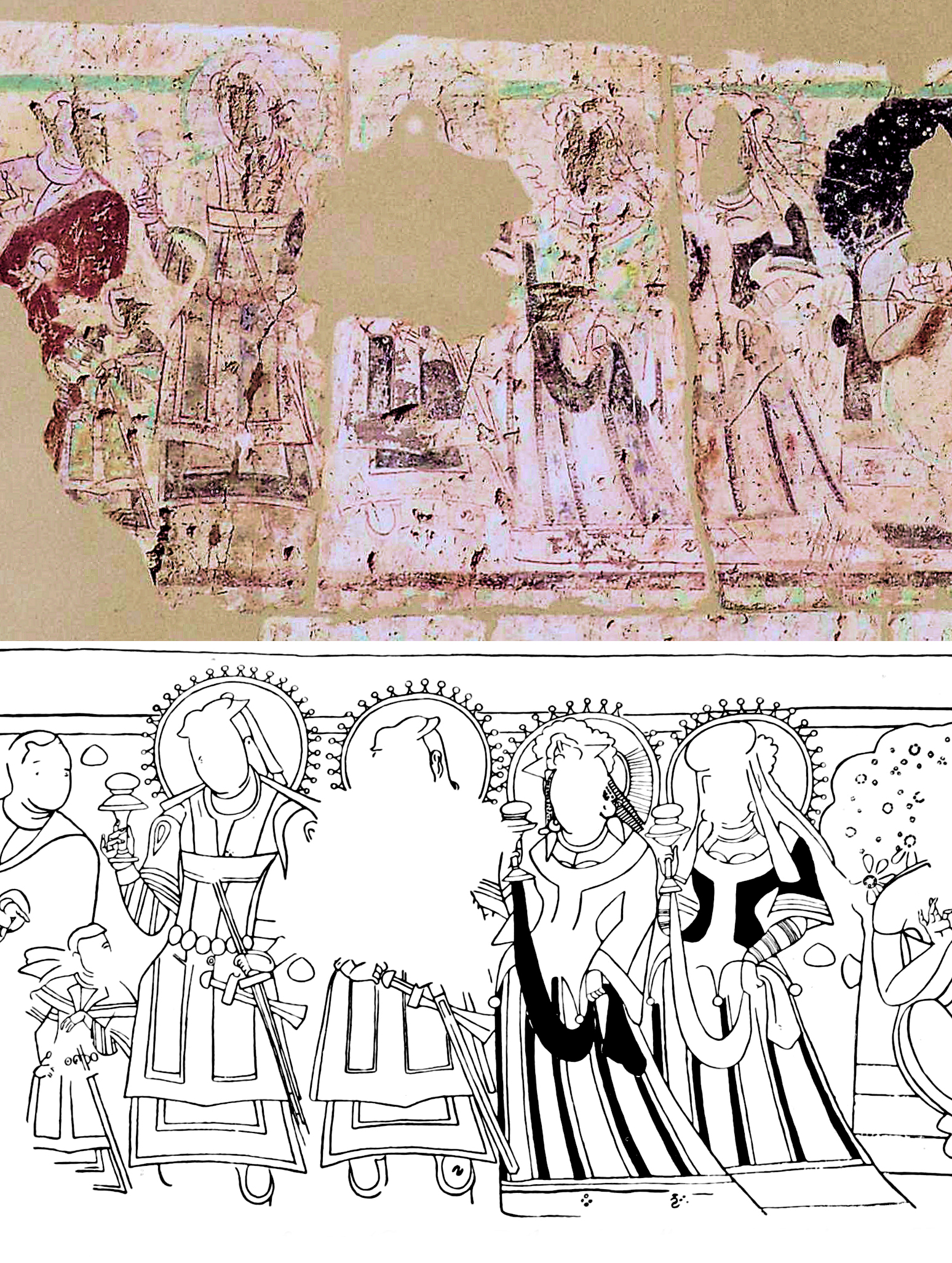
Women of Qiuci wearing U-shaped collar banbi (middle), Kizil caves.

In the early Tang dynasty up to the late 8th century, banbi were also popular among women, including noble and common women. According to the New Book of Tang, "banbi, skirt, and ru are common clothes for maids served at the Eastern Palace". In the 7th century, palace women could wear banbi over a plain shirt and a high-waisted, A-line skirts which could be monochrome or striped. In the Tang dynasty, new styles of Tanling banbi appeared and became extremely popular. Some shapes of banbi (such as the tanling banbi) worn in the early Tang appears to have been mainly influenced by the banbi worn in Qiuci. Figures wearing banbi and striped skirt holding a shawl (pipo) and wearing low cut upper garments appear on the murals of Kizil Grottoes in Xinjiang; the shape and matching garments customs were similar to the early Tang dynasty's women clothing attire. In the first decade of the 8th century, skirts in monochrome colours became more popular than stripped skirts. By the mid-Tang dynasty around the mid-8th century, upper garments with low décolletage lost popularity and women started to cover themselves with shawls; there were also new ideals of beauty favouring extremely plump and voluptuous women over the youthful slenderness of the Sui and the early Tang dynasties.

Tanling ruqun in the Tang dynasty

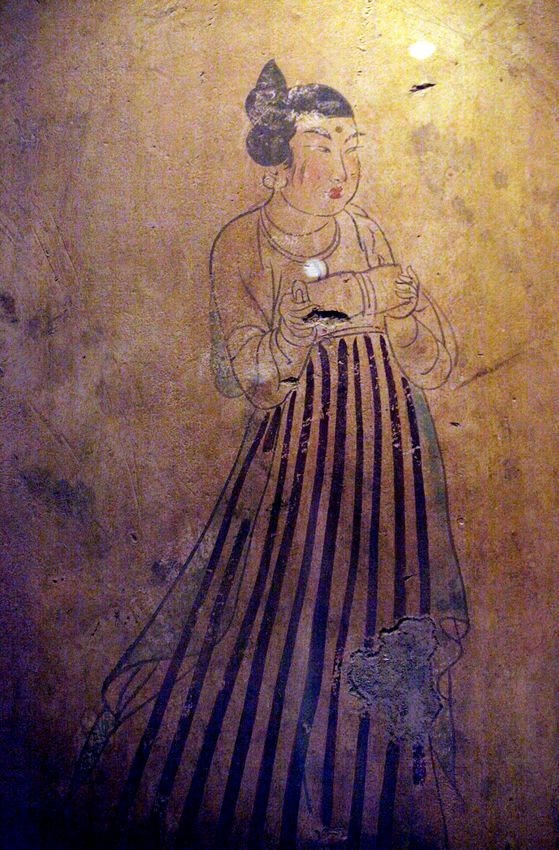
Maid from the tomb of Wei guifei (韋貴妃), Tang dynasty.

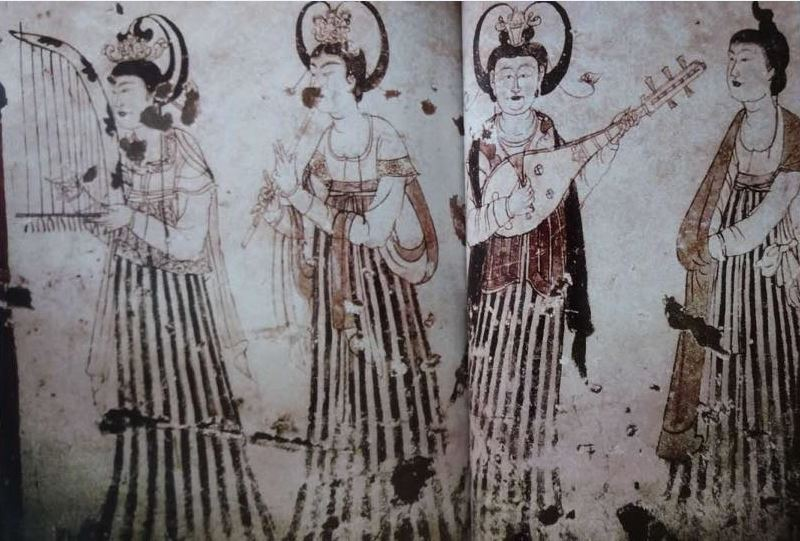
Three female musicians wearing Tanling ruqun, Tang dynasty.

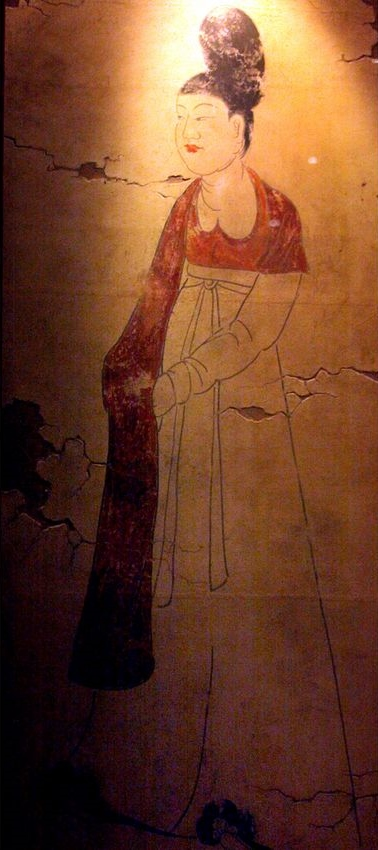
Maid, mural from Ashina Zhong (阿史那忠) tomb, Tang dynasty

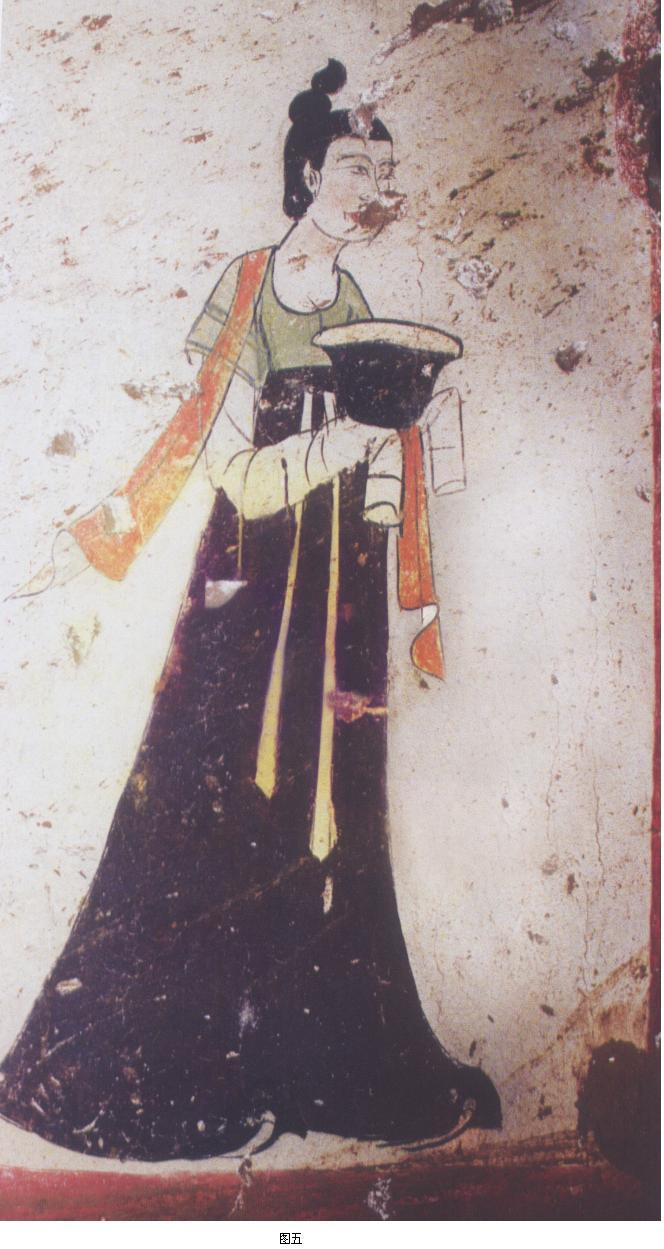
Tanling ruqun, Tang dynasty

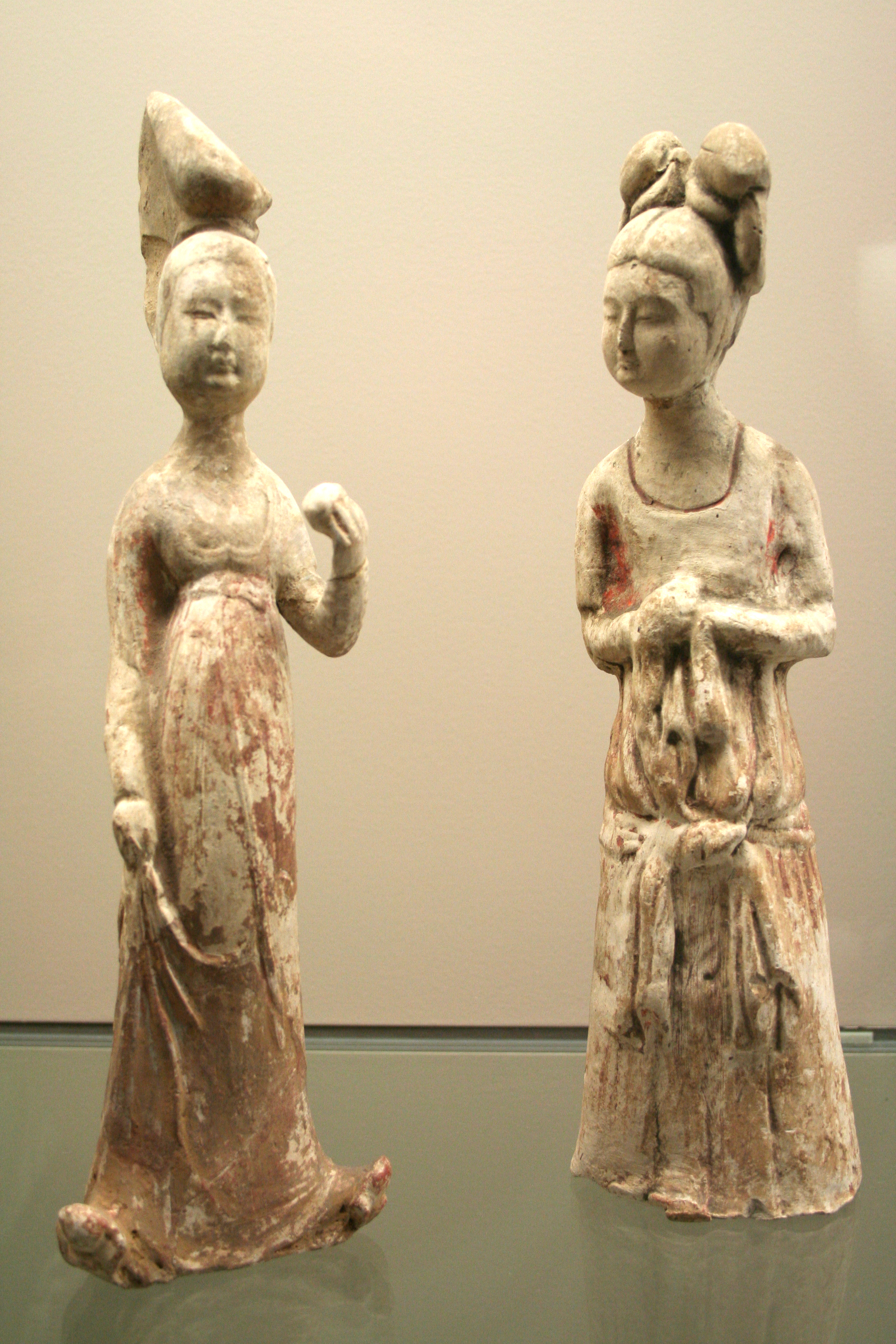

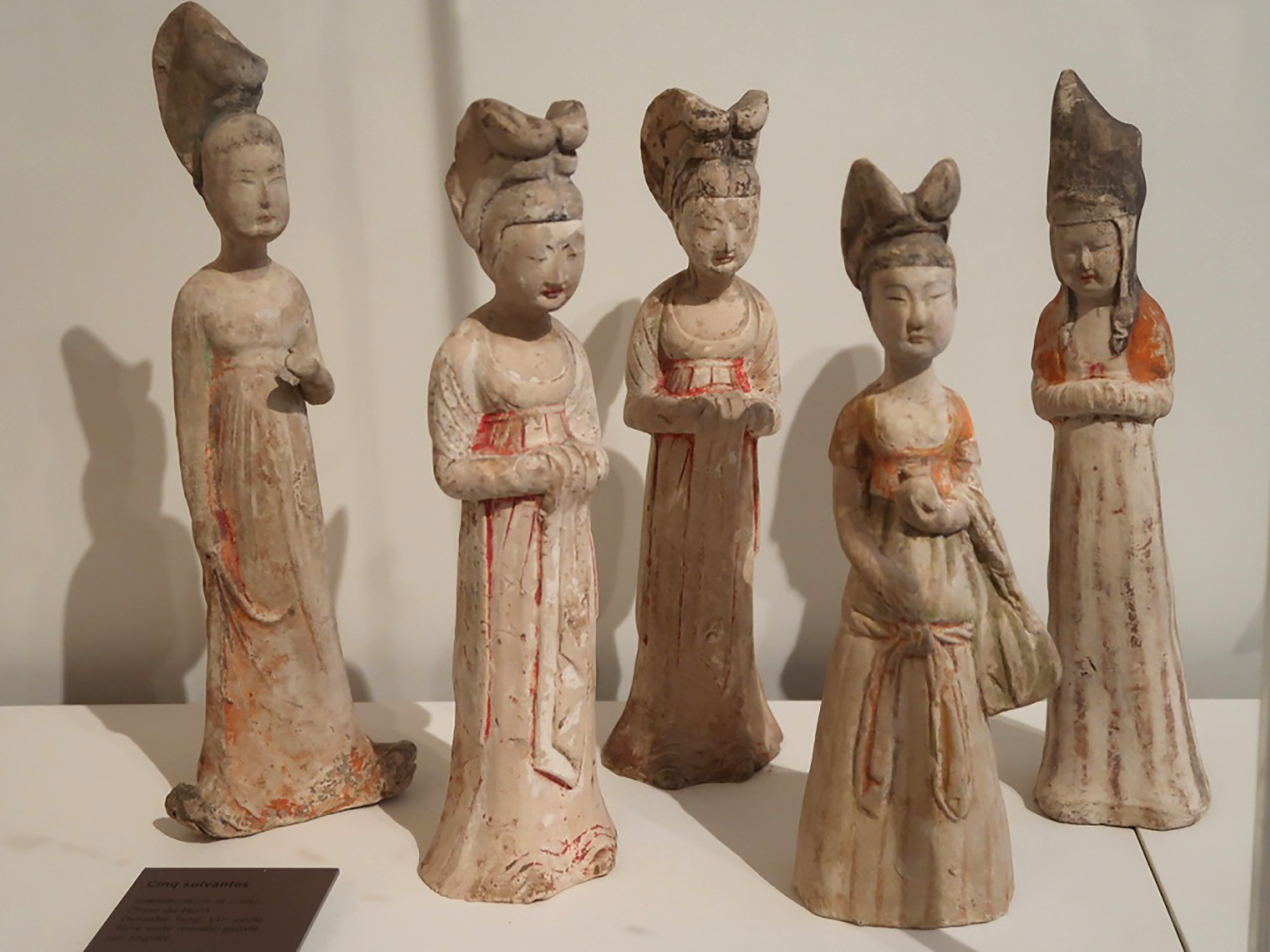

== Other types of ruqun ==
- Mianfu
- Qixiong ruqun
- Qungua (裙褂): a type of ruqun worn as a Traditional Chinese Wedding dress during Qing and the modern era.
- Xiuhefu (秀禾服): a modern bridal attire inspired by the aoqun and Qing wedding dress traditions.
- Xuanduan (玄端): a very formal dark ruqun with accessories; equivalent to the Western white tie.

== See also ==
- Han Chinese clothing
- List of Han Chinese clothing
- Ru - Chinese upper garment, also known as ao and shan
- Chang'ao - a long-version of the Chinese upper garment ao
- Banbi
