= Chinese patchwork =

Traditional Chinese textile art form

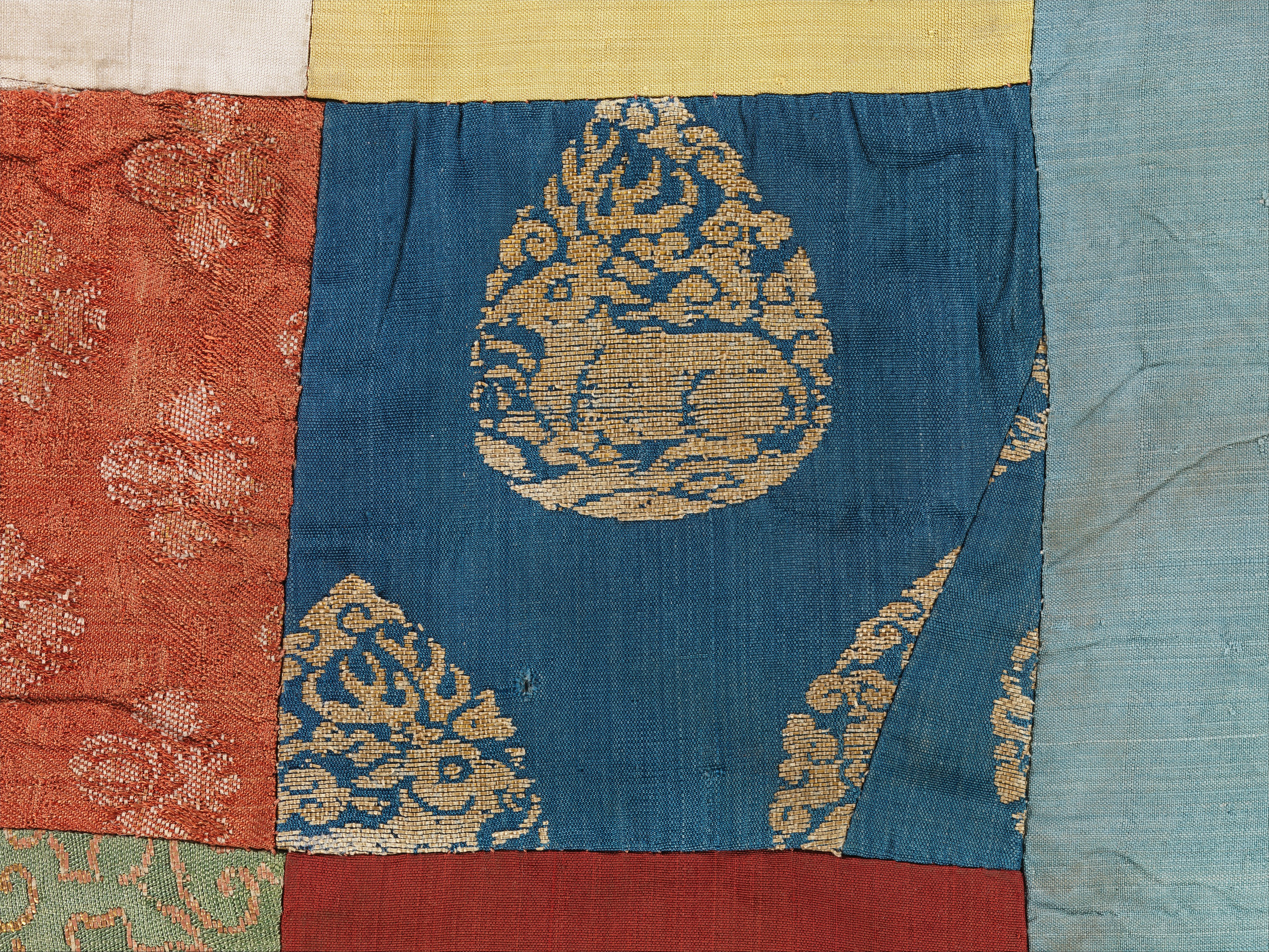
Chinese patchwork woven textile, medium: silk and metallic thread; 13th–14th century AD.

Chinese patchwork is a traditional form of Chinese needlework which has been widely circulated in Chinese folk arts. In China, patchwork has been used for millennia.

Chinese patchwork is made by sewing scraps of fabric together into a desired shape to form design art with a distinctive theme. This technique is still used in Chinese quilting. Silk or cotton is used to make the patchwork. The design for the patchwork often told a story of Chinese folklore. Traditional Chinese patchwork continues to exist in many rural areas in China; it is made by women.

== Types of Chinese patchwork ==
=== Baijiayi ===
Baijiayi (Chinese: 百家衣) or baijia pao (Chinese: 百家袍), also known Hundred-Families robe, or One hundred families robe, or One hundred families clothing, is a form of Chinese patchwork jacket, particularly for male children. The baijia yi is used as a protective talisman for a child. It is a traditional Han Chinese custom.

=== Baijia bei ===
Baijia bei (lit. translated as "one hundred families quilt"), also known as the "100 Good Wishes Quilt" or "one hundred families bedcovers", is a Northern Chinese patchwork tradition; it is customary to seek 100 people to donate a square piece of cloth in order to contribute to the quilt. These pieces of donated fabric are then sewn into a quilt which embodies the good wishes, luck and energy of the quilt contributors.

Although the Chinese word "bei" is translated as "quilt" in English, it does not conform to the Western definition of a quilt (a bed covering with three layers held together with quilting stitch).

=== Jia sha ===
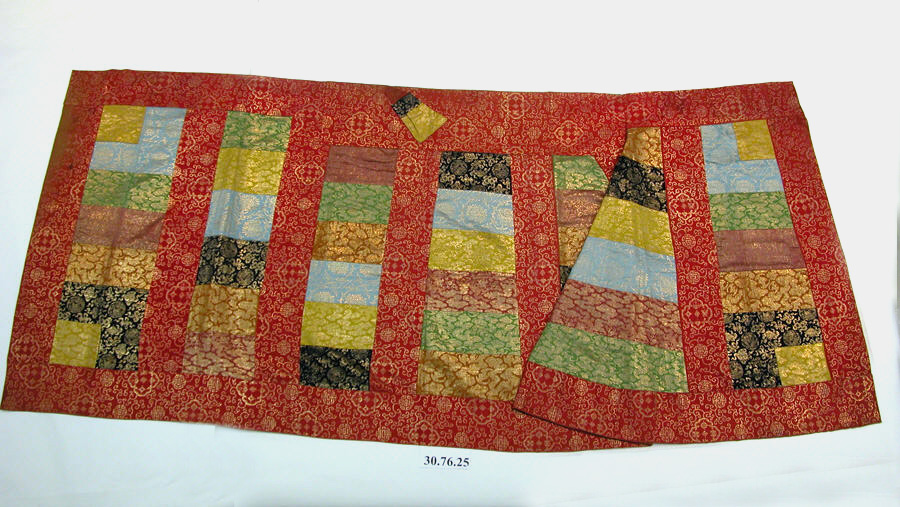
A jiasha used as a theatrical costume for a Buddhist priest; Silk brocade patchwork, 18th century.

Jia sha (Chinese: 袈裟) is a form of patchwork robe worn by Chinese Buddhist priests to demonstrate their commitments to asceticism. It was made of fabric donated by patrons, often wealthy patrons, who give them silk fabrics out of charity and in order to collect spiritual merits. The small pieces of fabric were sewn together before being decorated. The jia sha was derived from the kasaya (Indian Buddhist robe).

=== Shuitianyi ===
Shuitianyi is a form of women's patchwork garment which was popular in the Ming dynasty. It was made of irregular fabrics sewn together. This form of garment reflected the Ming dynasty's tendency towards fashion novelty.

=== Yanchuan patchwork ===
Yanchuan patchwork is a distinctive form of traditional Chinese patchwork which is performed by a great number of people in the Yanchuan region of northern Shaanxi province in China. It uses combines the use of sewing and embroidery along with a variety of colours, textures and cloths of different shapes to create patterns. It originated as a means to extend the use of damaged clothing by sewing and mending it into traditional patterns while simultaneously increasing its aesthetic value.

=== Other uses ===
The uses of Chinese patchwork are not limited to traditional clothing but have been widely used in modern society for curtains, children's shoes, caps, dudous, scarves, women's handbags, aprons, men's cigarette cases and wallets.

== Influences and derivatives ==
=== One hundred Good Wishes Quilts ===
One Hundred Good Wishes quilt (acronym: OHGWQ) is an early 21st century commemorative form of quilt which is made by American families to welcome a Chinese child adoptee. This practice originated from a northern Chinese patchwork practice and spread quickly through the China adoption community through the use of the internet. This form of hybrid quilting projects are also described as "baijia bei" (百家被) on OHGWQ websites.

It may have been inspired by the baijia yi. It is made of donated fabric from friends, family members, and internet acquaintances who may have themselves adopted Chinese children. The quilt also contains both Chinese and American culture elements (i.e the use of quilt as a commemorative object in US and the protective aspect of Chinese patchwork) and represent a point of contact between these two cultures which are distinctive from each other.

== Patchwork process ==
The patches are cut into similar sizes and shapes and then leave at least 1/2-inch on each side of the patch for a seam. Arrange them in patterns or at random. Hold two patches face-to-face and stitch them together. Continue this process until the front of the quilt has been sewn into one solid piece.

=== Patterns ===
Many patterns exist, while the quilting block is one that is widely used. Other patterns include the Chinese coin, 100 good wishes, and lattice. Patterns may incorporate geometric shapes such as squares, triangles, hexagons, and diamonds.

Traditional culture and folk legends are often the themes for patchworks, such as the Qilin Bringing the Child, Door Gods, the Dragon King and the Kitchen God.

=== Embroidery ===
Some Chinese patchwork is made using pieces of fabric which are adorned with embroideries; this marks a difference from Korean patchwork, which is usually made of pieces of unadorned fabric instead of embroidered fabrics.

== Gallery ==
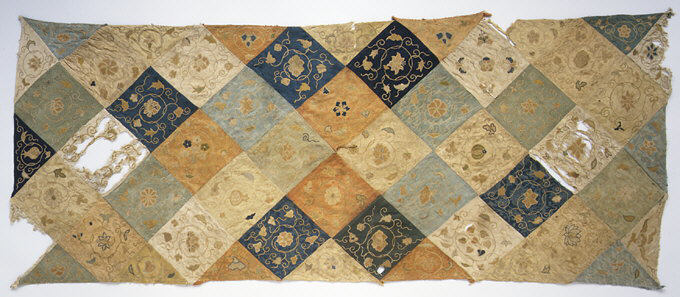
Chinese embroidered patchwork Panel, c. 14th century, Late Yuan - Early Ming dynasty.

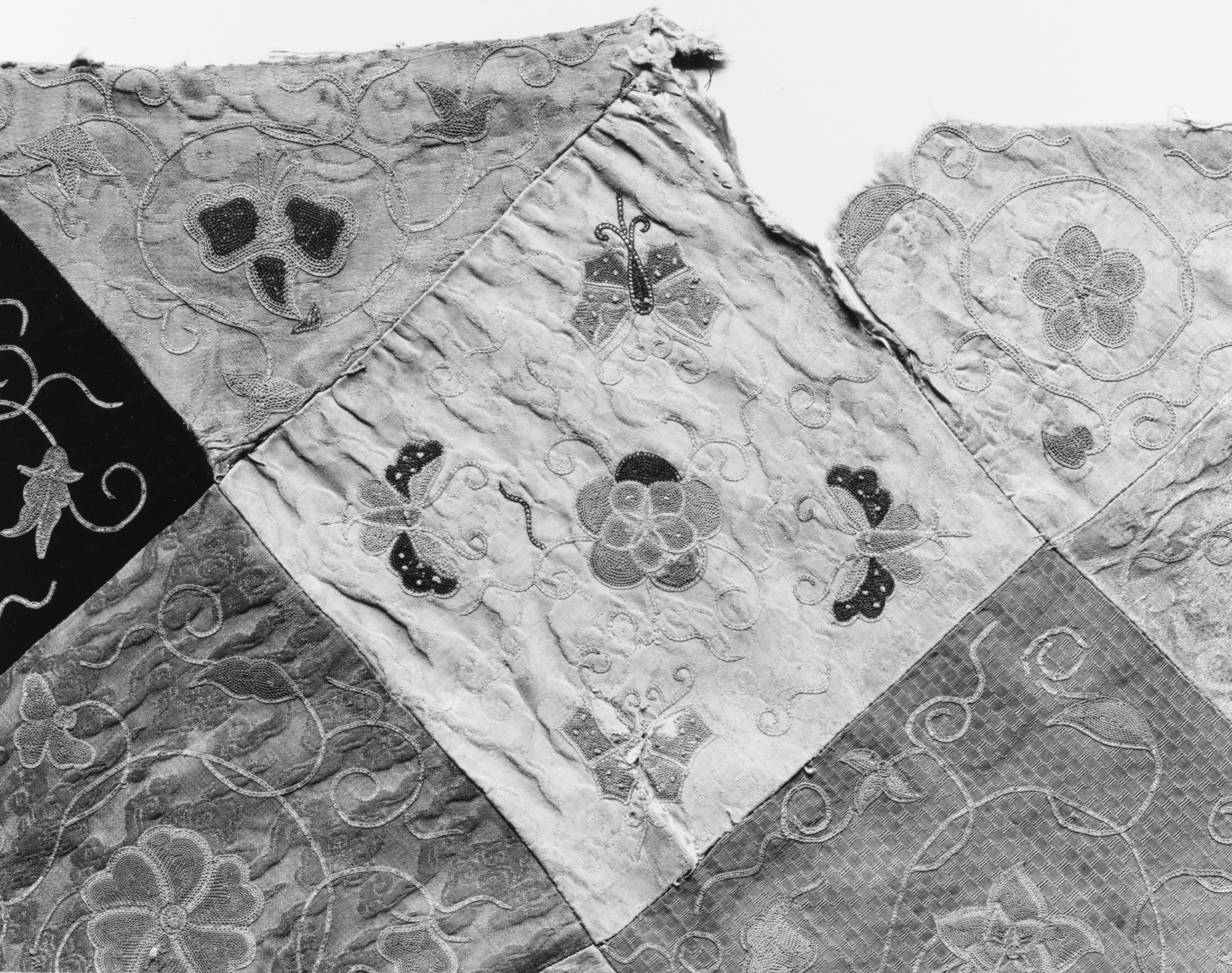
Chinese embroidered patchwork Panel (close-up view), c. 14th century, Late Yuan - Early Ming dynasty.

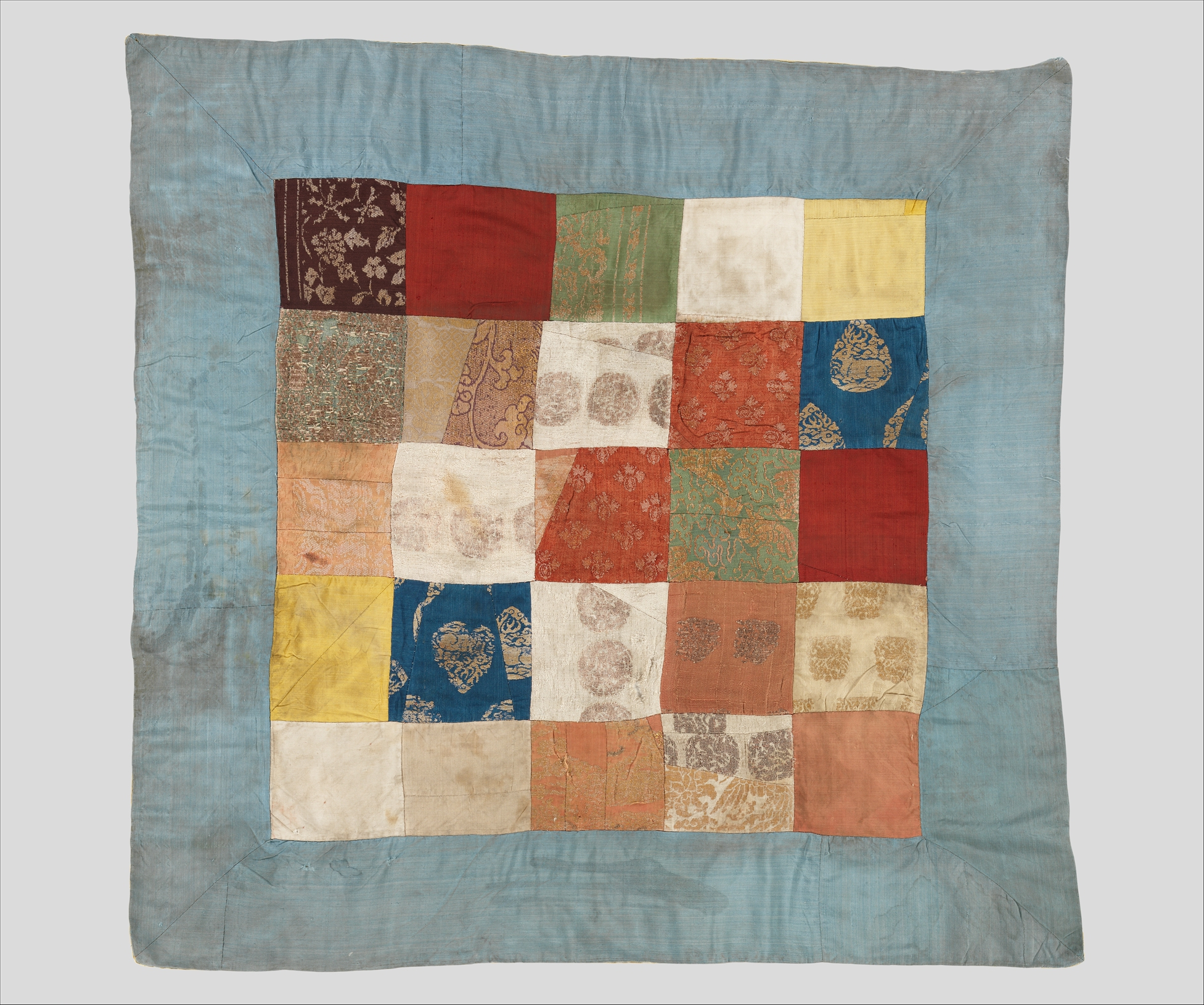
Chinese patchwork of Woven Textiles, medium: silk and metallic thread, 13th–14th century, Yuan - early Ming dynasty.

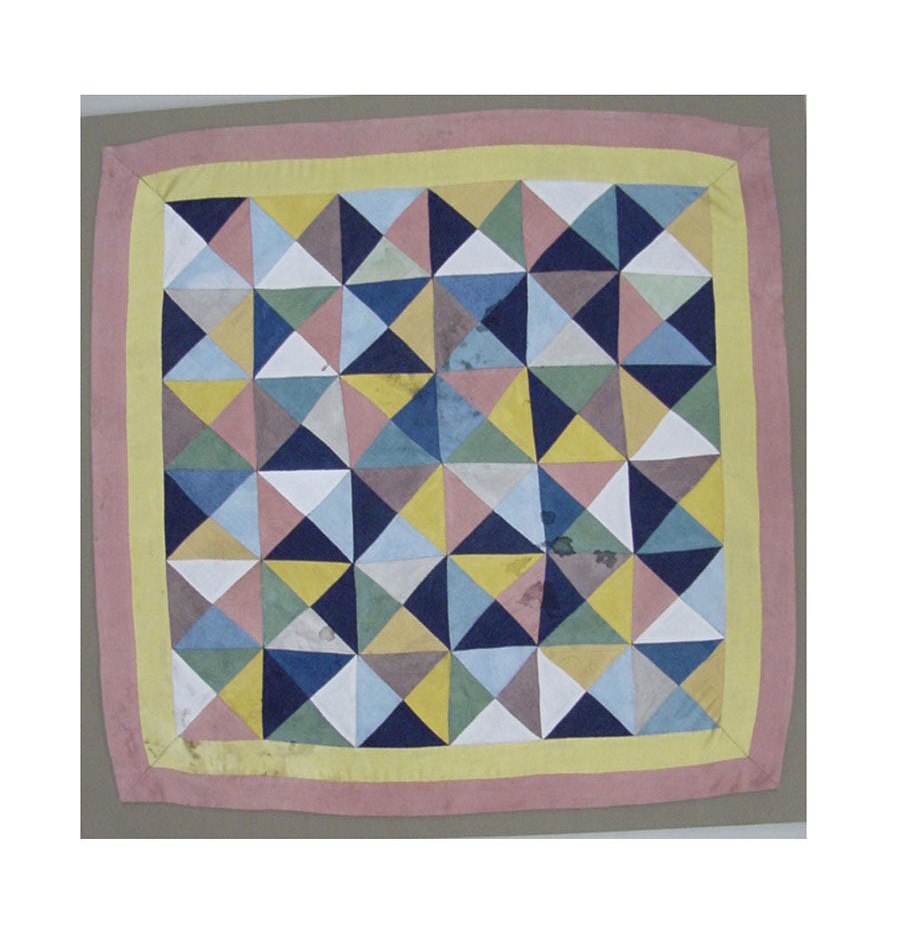
Chinese patchwork of woven textiles; medium: silk; 17th–18th century.

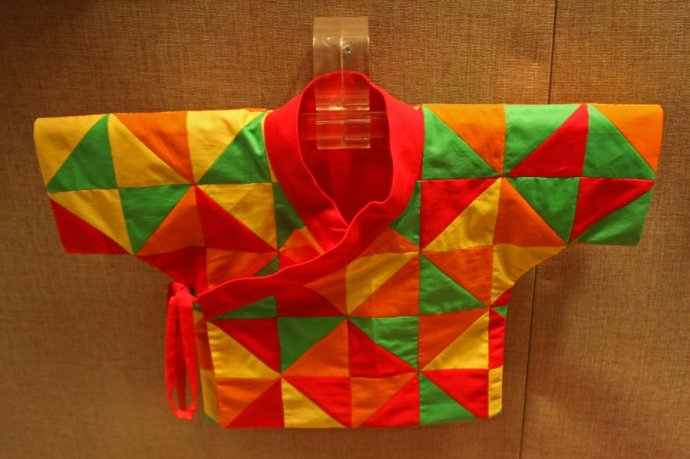
Baijia yi

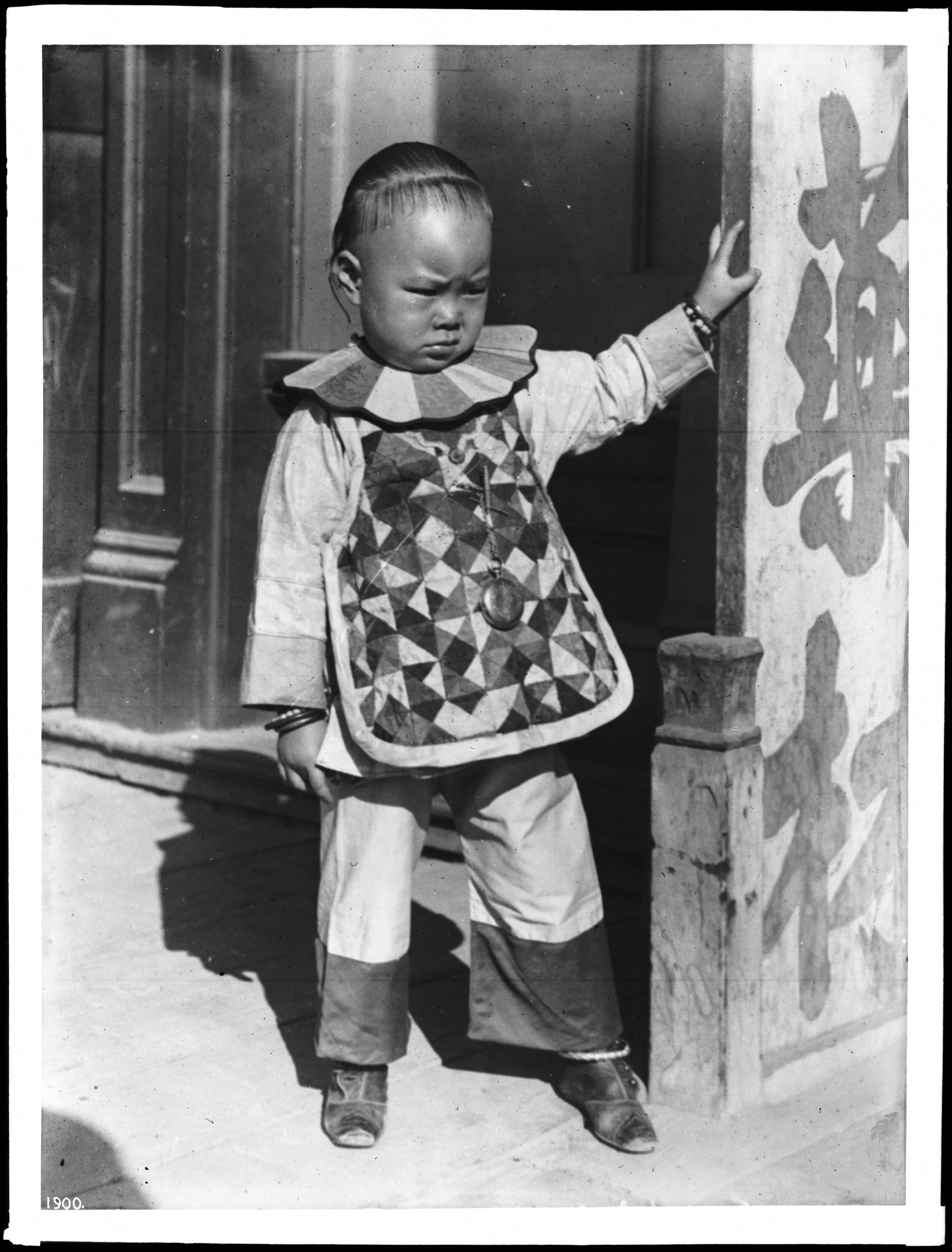
A small Chinese boy wearing a patchwork bib.

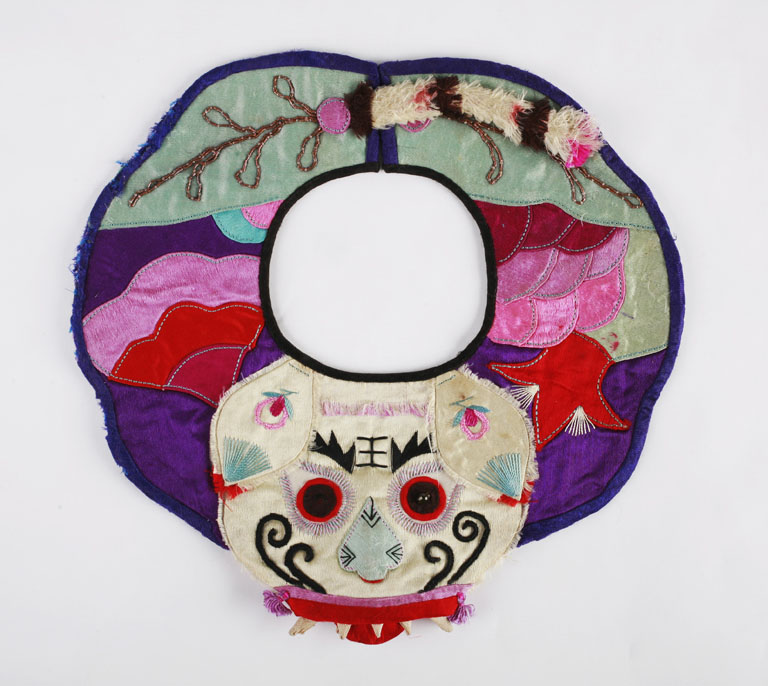
Embroidered infant bib.

== See also ==
- Bojagi
- Korean fabric arts
- Quilting
- Shuitianyi
