= Yaoqun =

Traditional Chinese overskirt

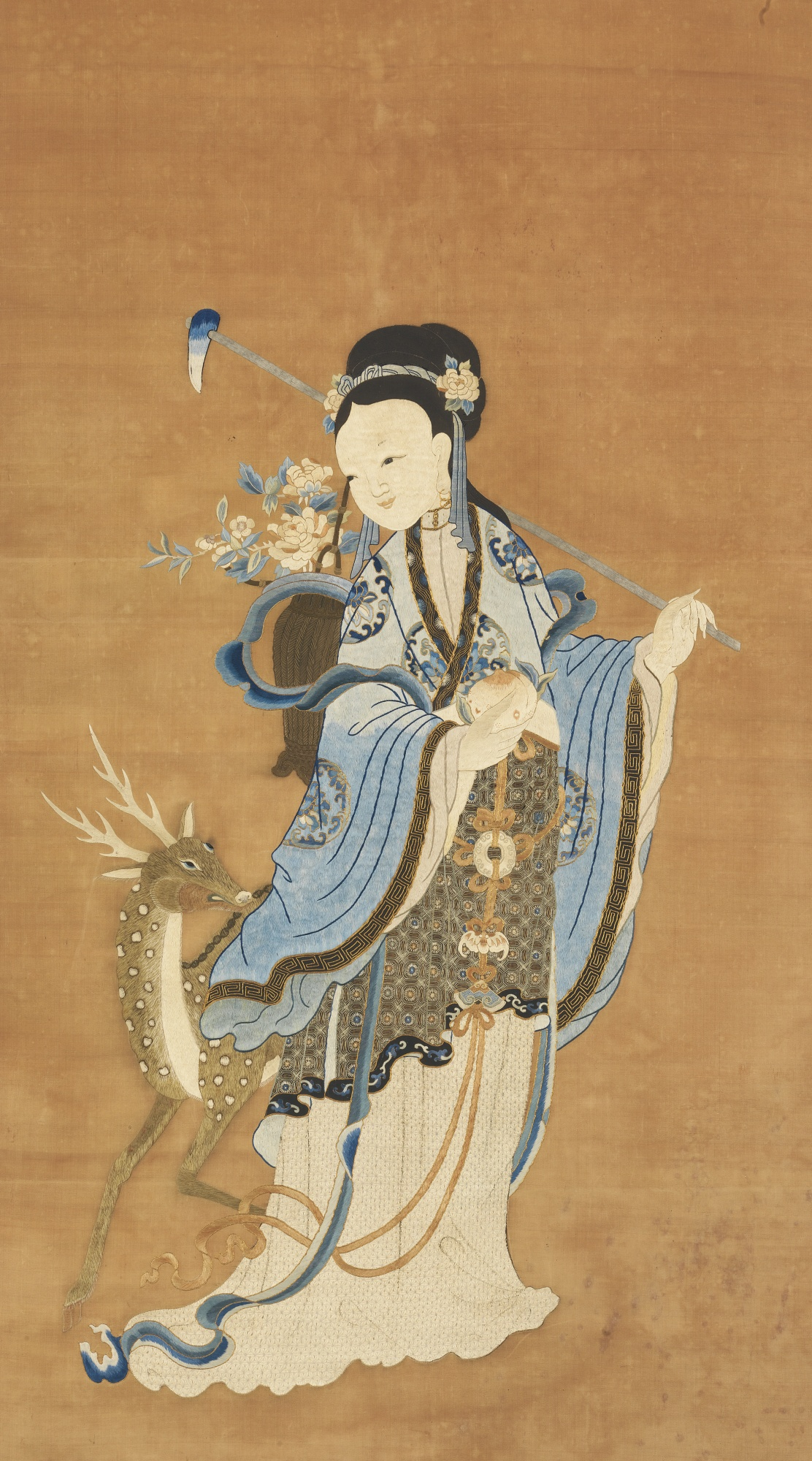
- Brown yaoqun over a white qun, Qing dynasty painting, 19th century
- Chinese: 腰裙
Transcriptions

Weichang
- Traditional Chinese: 圍裳
- Simplified Chinese: 围裳
Transcriptions

Yaoqun (Chinese: 腰裙), also known as weichang (Chinese: 围裳), is typically a form of abbreviated or short qun, similar to an overskirt, in Hanfu. It was typically worn by Han Chinese women over their long-length qun, traditional Chinese skirts. It was typically worn along with the ruqun consisting of a short ru, which reaches the waist-level, and a long-length qun. Throughout centuries, the yaoqun has often depicted in Chinese paintings, unearthed artifacts and in Chinese tomb mural paintings.

== Similar items ==
- Baidiequn
- Overskirt
- Bixi

== See also ==
- Hanfu
- List of Hanfu
- Qun

== Gallery ==
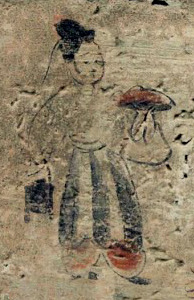

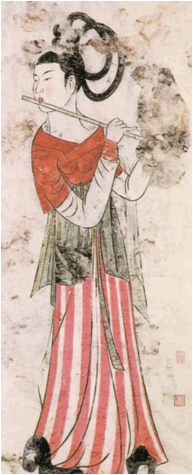

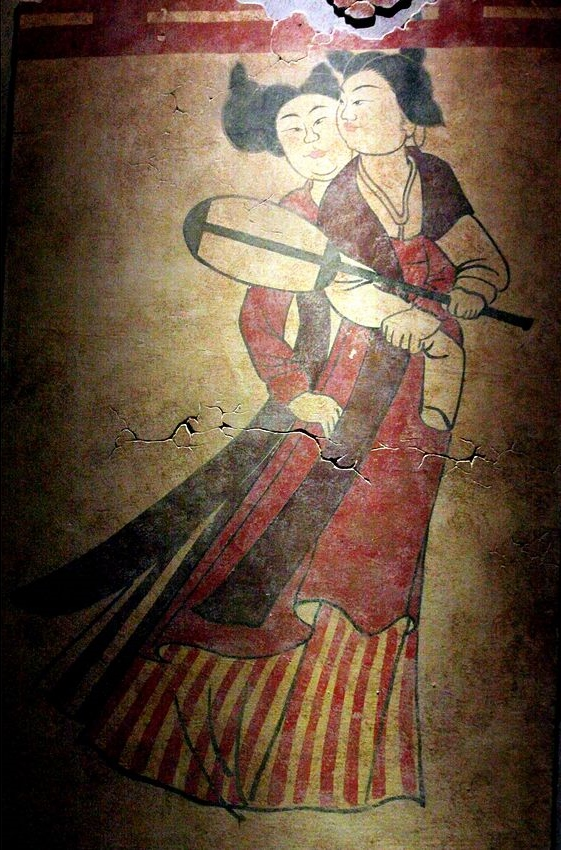

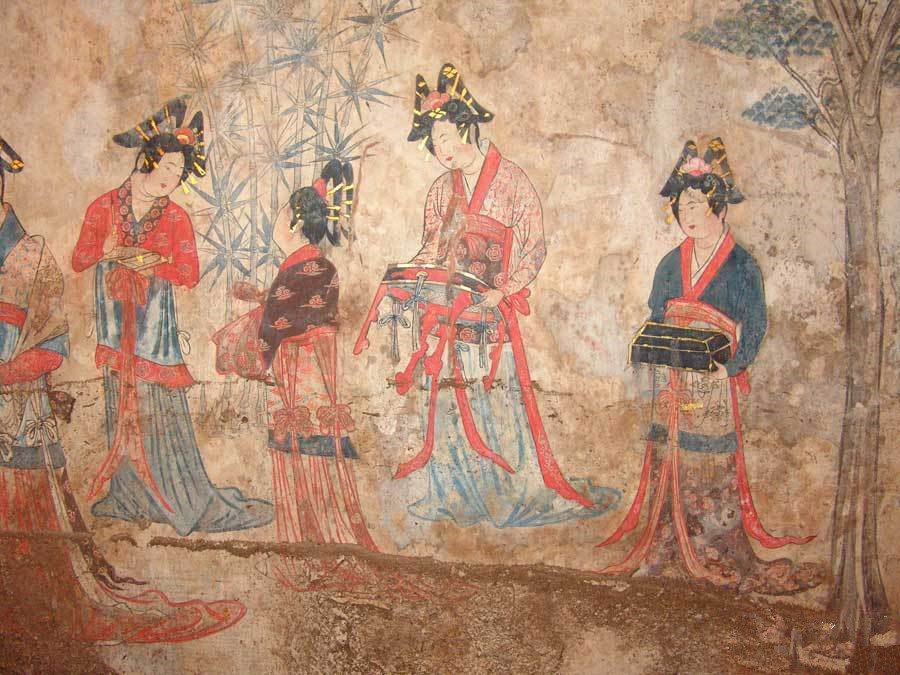

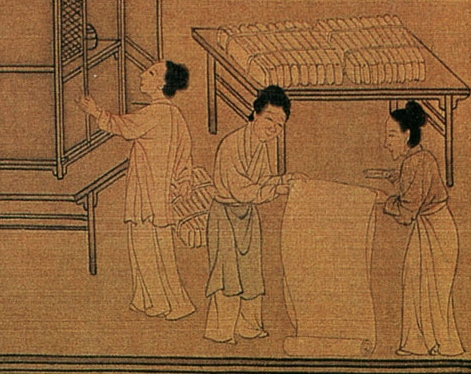

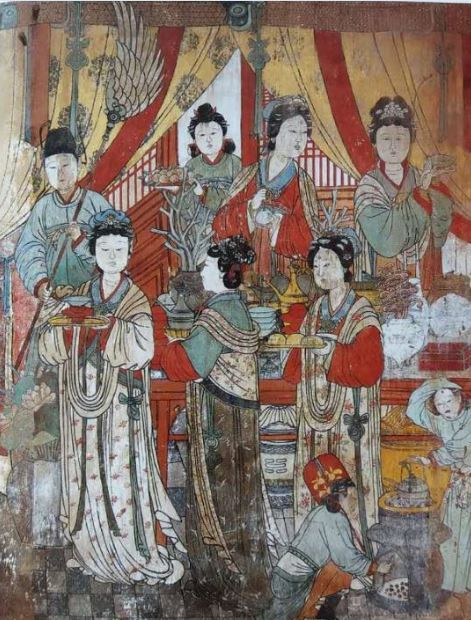

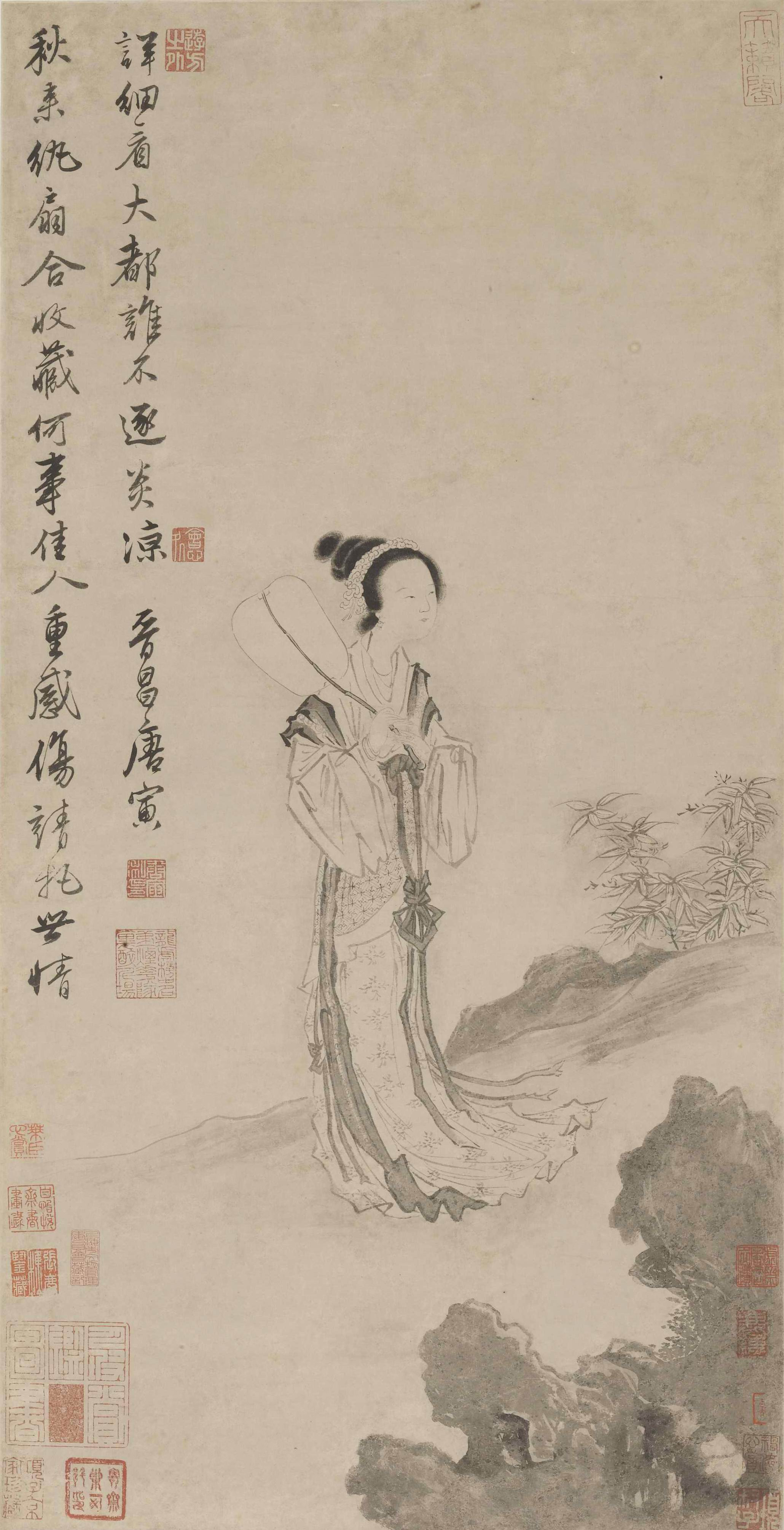

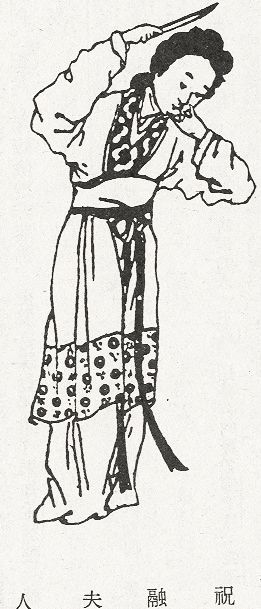

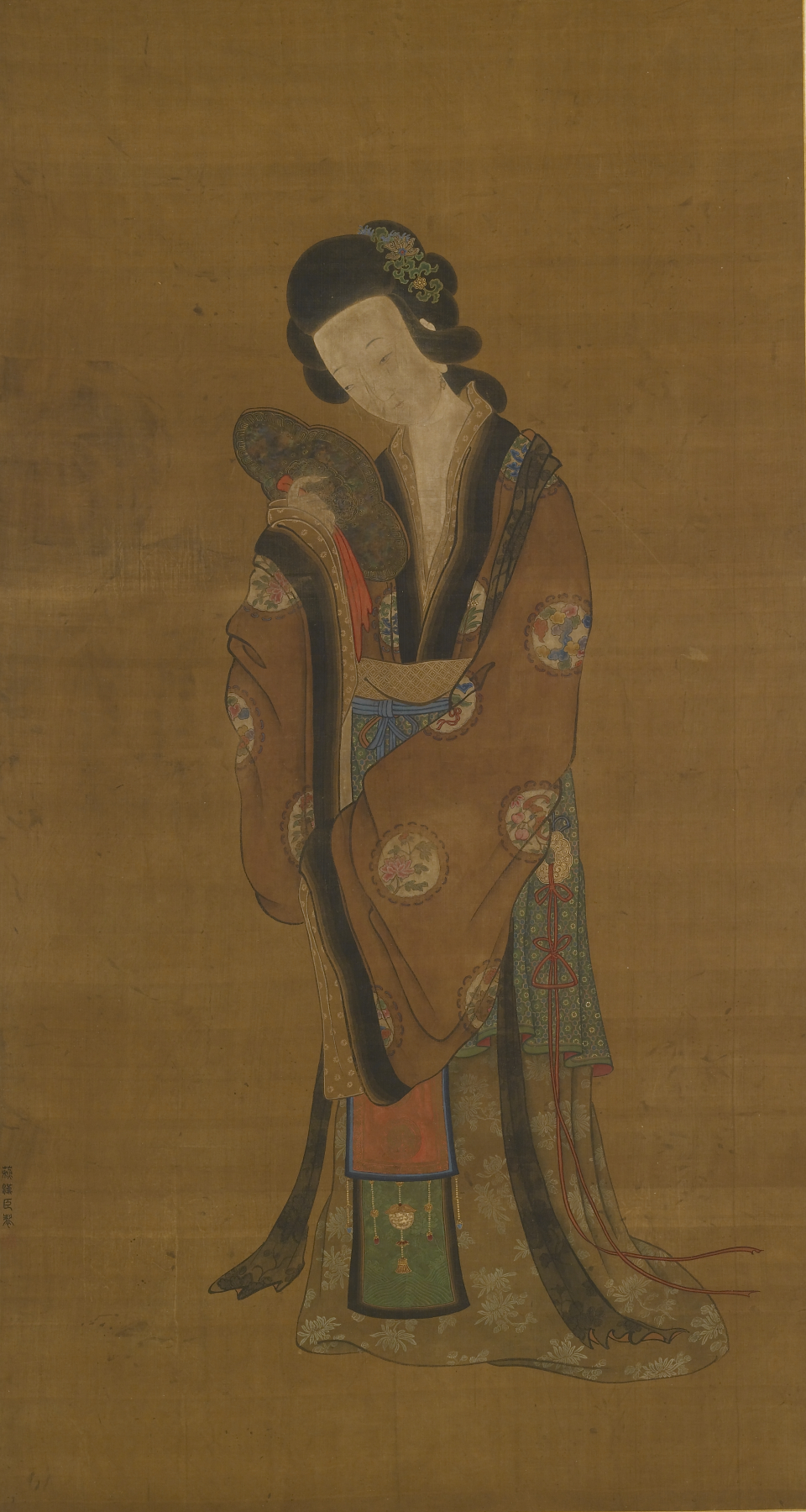
