= Shuitianyi =

Chinese patchwork clothing

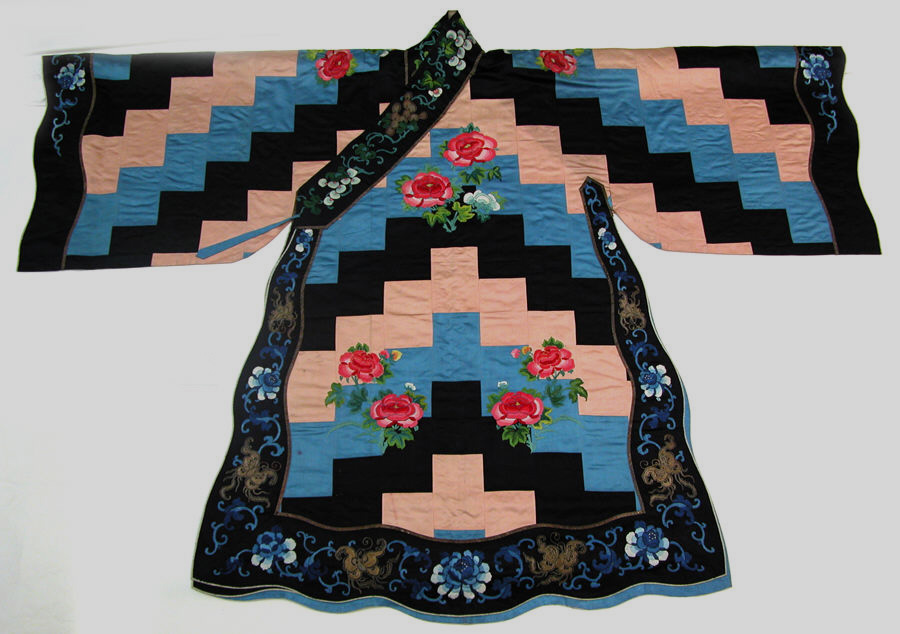
- A style of shuitianyi used as a theatrical robe for a female Daoist priest (front view), 18th century.

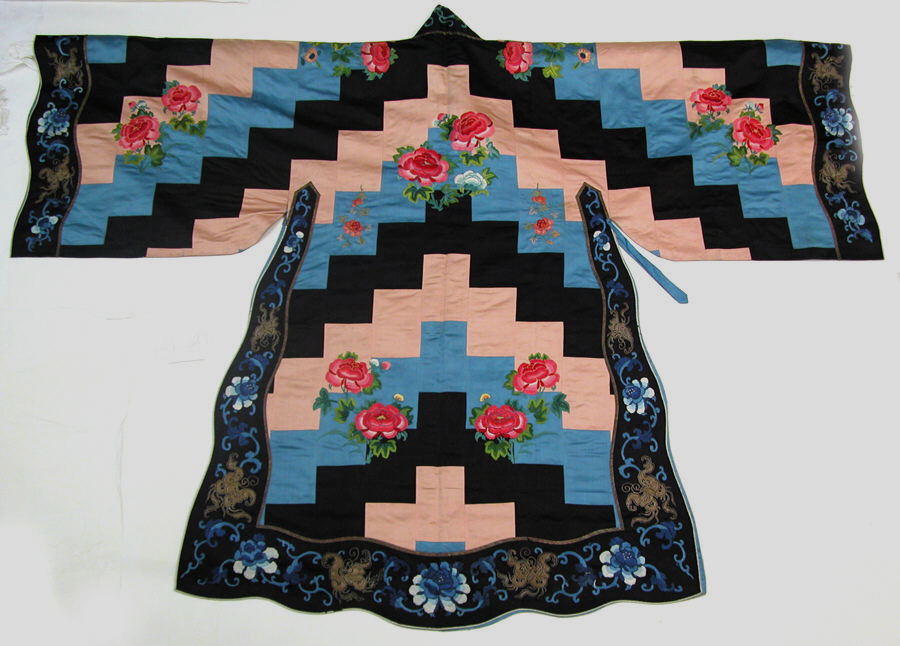
- Back view
- Chinese: 水田衣
- Literal meaning: "Paddy field garment" or "rice-paddy robe"
Transcriptions
Standard Mandarin
- Hanyu Pinyin: Shuǐtián yī

Shuitianyi (Chinese: 水田衣), also known as "paddy field garment", "Shuitian clothing", or "rice-paddy robe", is a non-religious Chinese patchwork gown which was made and worn by women in China during the Ming dynasty and Qing dynasty; it was made by using many pieces of fabric sewn together (similar to Chinese patchwork); the clothing reflected the era's tendency towards fashion novelty during the Ming dynasty.

== Origins and Development ==
The shuitianyi is a popular, but rare fashion phenomenon, which appeared in the middle and the late Ming dynasty and remained popular in the Qing dynasty. The shuitianyi may have originally originated from poor people, who would use whatever leftover clothing they would have at hand for saving purposes, and was initially only popular among poor women. Its origins may have been inspired by Buddhist robes, the Kasaya or Baina, which was made when monks would make clothes out of a variety of useless clothes. It was later adopted by aristocratic women during Ming dynasty who found it beautiful, and they began to cut cloth (even from entire brocade) voluntarily into a design shape and sew it into an aristocratic form of the shuitianyi. While the shuitianyi was a popular form of fashion for women in the Ming dynasty, men during this era would also wear baina clothing.

== Other versions ==
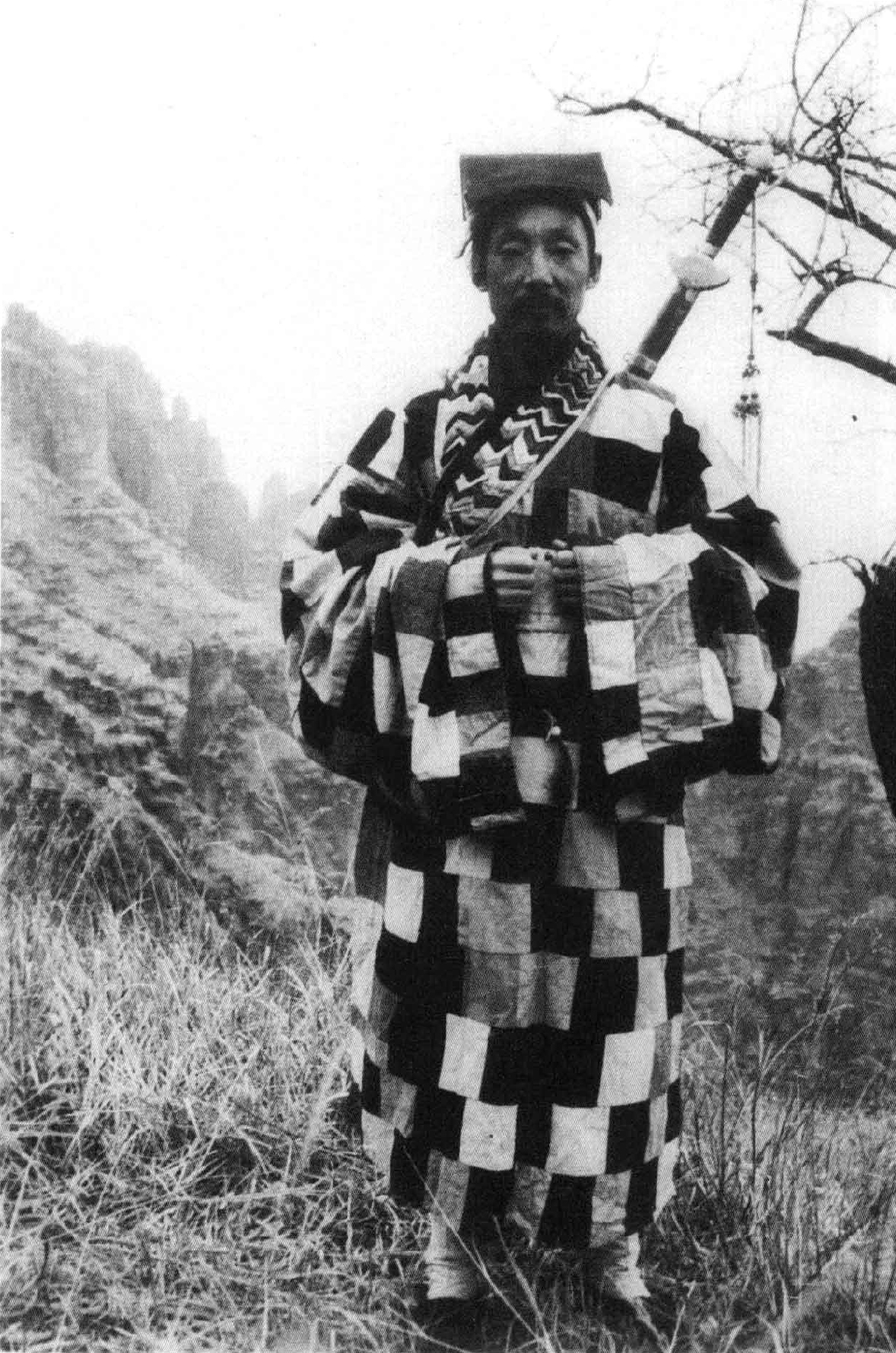
Taoist Li Yuantong wearing shuitianyi, also known as bainayi (百衲衣).

=== Baijiayi ===
A version of the shuitianyi worn by children is called baijiayi.

=== Sanse dao beixin ===
In Beijing opera, the shuitianyi is worn as a costume called sanse dao beixin (Chinese: 三色道背心; pinyin: sānsè dào bèixīn; lit. 'Three color Daoist vest'). It originates from Buddhist clothing and represents the ragged clothing of Buddha.

The sanse dao beixin is characterized by a diamond-shaped pattern which is created through patchwork. It can be used by actors who perform as male or female monks and as Taoist characters. While both male and female roles used it; however, there are differences between the man's and woman's sanse dao beixin.

The female version looks like a knee-length pifeng as it features a centre-front opening and a collar band which ends at the mid-chest level; however, it differs from the pifeng due to the absence of sleeves. (Note: The main difference between a pifeng and a beixin is the presence or absence of sleeves. A pifeng has long sleeves while beixin is sleeveless. See page beizi and bijia for more details.)

The man's version is floor-length and the collar band has a straight lower edge; it is also tied with a sash without the back of the garment being caught in the sash, which is the manner monks wear their vest. When male monks characters wear it, it indicates that they have outstanding martial arts skills.

== See also ==
- List of Hanfu
- Hanfu
- Chinese patchwork
