= Baijiayi =

Chinese patchwork jacket used as a protective charm for children

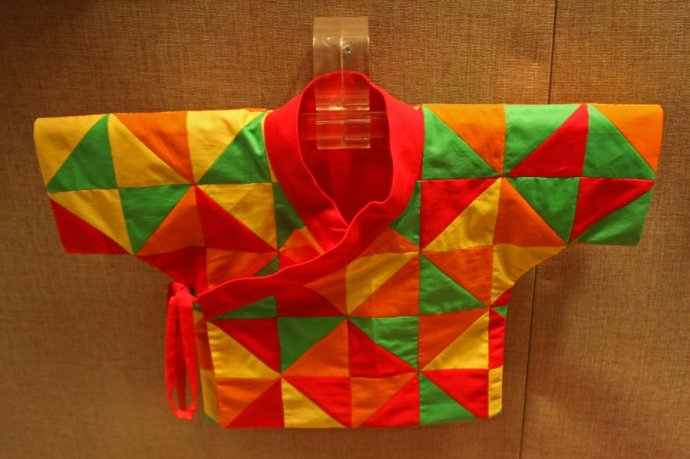
- A child's baijiayi.

Chinese name
- Chinese: 百家衣
- Literal meaning: One-hundred family clothing
Transcriptions
Standard Mandarin
- Hanyu Pinyin: Bǎijiāyī

Baijiapao
- Chinese: 百家袍
- Literal meaning: One-hundred families robe
Transcriptions
Standard Mandarin
- Hanyu Pinyin: Bǎijiāpáo

English name
- English: One hundred families robe/ Hundred-Families robe/ One hundred families clothing

Baijiayi (Chinese: 百家衣; pinyin: bǎijiāyī), also known as baijiapao (Chinese: 百家袍; pinyin: bǎijiāpáo) and sometimes referred as One hundred families robe, Hundred-Families robe, or One hundred families clothing in English, is a form of Chinese patchwork jacket, particular for male children. The baijiayi is used as a protective talisman for children. It is a traditional Han Chinese custom garment, which has been passed down for centuries.

== Cultural significance and symbolism ==
The baijiayi is a symbol of longevity, and it was one of the ritual procedures of the "One-hundred-day celebration", along with the baijia locks. It is made of donated fabrics, and is composed of one hundred pieces of fabric which could be shaped into tessellated squares, triangles, diamonds, rectangles, and hexagons. It could also be embroidered with symbols and motifs which were considered auspicious, such as auspicious clouds, the Chinese zodiac, the bagua and the five poisons.

In the past, due to the lag in health care and education, infant mortality was relatively high. Nevertheless, people believed that an infant's death was due to a ghost. The baijiayi was supposed to protect the child from evil spirits through the use of many donated fabrics of multiple colours. These small pieces of cloth was collected from various local families, which were supposed to represent " one hundred families". These pieces of fabric would symbolize the combined strength of the donators and were believed protect their sons from or ward off evil spirits and ghosts. The mother would receive these pieces of fabrics in order to make the finished baijiayi for her child. The baijiayi could not be taken off until the child reaches one year old.

== History ==
=== Origins ===
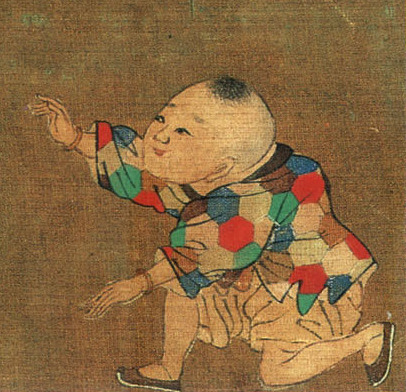
Child wearing baijiayi, a Song dynasty painting.

People started making Chinese patchwork in the Liu Song of the Southern dynasty era. The first emperor of Liu Song dynasty, named Liu Yu, was born in an underprivileged family. His mother gathered rags from the neighbourhoods to make a patchwork cloth. When he became the emperor, he perceived this kind of patchwork as the symbol for his impoverished childhood. All the infants in Liu's family had to use the patchwork so that his offspring could know how fortunate they were. Afterward, his subjects followed this royal custom of making "Bai jia yi" for their babies.

== Other version ==
A similar style of clothing to the baijiayi is the shuitianyi.

== See also ==
- List of Hanfu
- Hanfu
- List of Chinese symbols, designs, and art motifs
- Chinese auspicious ornaments in textile and clothing
- Chinese patchwork
- Shuitianyi
