= Korean fabric arts =

Embroidered silk badge from the Joeson Dynasty

Korean fabric arts are fabric arts in the style or tradition used by the people on the Korean Peninsula. Fabrics often used include guksa, nobang, sha, jangmidan, Korean-made jacquard, brocade, and satin. Specific crafts consist of the Korean quilts known as bojagi, Korean embroidery, Korean knots, Korean clothing, and the rarer arts of Korean blinds weaving and Korean paper clothing.

== Historical context ==
It can be difficult to study very old fabrics because they degrade over time. The oldest surviving examples of bojagi, for example, are from the Joseon Dynasty, which was from 1392-1910CE.

During the Joseon Dynasty, due to the Confucian society, women were not allowed to leave their house or its courtyard during the day; when they did go out, they had to be covered by cloth. With these restrictions, being able to create fabric arts was likely a welcome outlet of expression.

== Modern day ==
There have been some specific efforts to repopularize Korean fabric arts. The Korean government established October 21 as Hanbok Day. In 2022, Hanbok saenghwal, the cultural practices encompassing the making, wearing, and enjoying of hanbok, was recognized as a National Intangible Cultural Heritage by the Cultural Heritage Administration.

== Symbolic meaning ==
According to author Youngmin Lee, making a fiber arts piece using the clothing of family members is meant to bring them prosperity.

== See also ==
- List of Korean clothing
