= Xuanduan =

Dark Chinese court dress

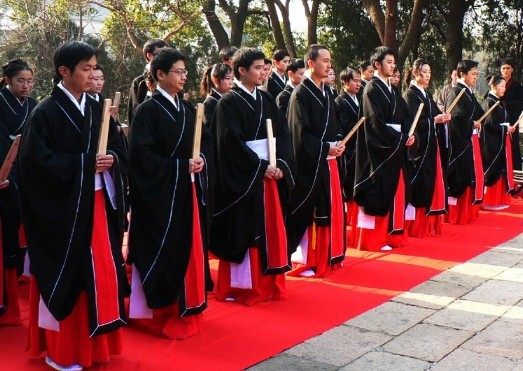
- Men and women in xuanduan (玄端), possibly a Guan Li ceremony, 2007.
- Simplified Chinese: 玄端
- Literal meaning: Dark-coloured square-cut; Black and square-edged
Transcriptions
Standard Mandarin
- Hanyu Pinyin: Xuánduān

Alternative Chinese name
- Chinese: 元端
Transcriptions
Standard Mandarin
- Hanyu Pinyin: Yuánduān

Xuanduan (Chinese: 玄端), also known as yuanduan (Chinese: 元端, for the naming taboo of Zhao Xuanlang, the prioclaimed ancestor by Song dynasty emperors, and Xuanye, Kangxi Emperor), is a form of Chinese court dress (and/or ritual garment) which was made of dark or black fabric. It is a form of yichang (i.e. a set of attire composed of upper and lower garment). It was worn since the Western Zhou dynasty. During the Ming dynasty, under the reign of Emperor Jiajing, the xuanduan became a model for the regulations reforms related to yanfu (casual or leisure clothing) worn by the emperor and officials.

== Terminology ==
The term xuanduan appears in the Liji in the section Yuzao (玉藻) and in the Zhouli. The xuanduan is named after its shape (端; duan) which is angular (i.e. it is made by using the whole width of a squared-shape fabric) and by its colour. The character xuan (玄) can literally be translated as 'dark' or 'black'. The term xuanduan is literally translated as 'dark coloured Square-cut', or 'Black and square-edged', although some authors have also translated it as 'dark solemn' or 'black straight'.

== History ==
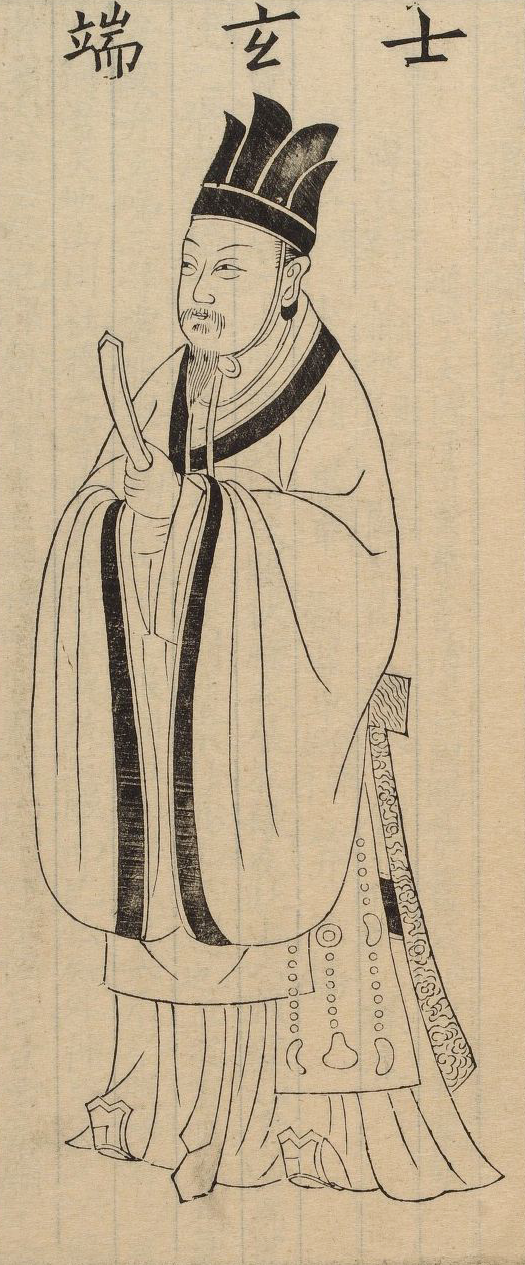
Xuanduan worn by the shi 士.

During the Western Zhou dynasty, it was a form of a daily clothing which was worn by the emperor and ordinary commoners.

In the Zhou dynasty, it was worn by emperor when they were not at court, on sacrificial occasions by princes, and by scholars when they would pay their respects to their parents in the morning.

According to the Liji in the section Yuzao, it was also a form of ritual clothing for the emperor, who wore it to salute the appearance of the sun outside the eastern gate and when he would listen to notification on the first day of the first month outside the southern gate; and by the Princes of States who wore xuanduan when sacrificing (诸侯玄端以祭).

=== Ming dynasty ===
During the reign of Emperor Jiajing of Ming, sartorial reforms took place. Emperor Jiajing reformed yanfu (i.e. daily casual or leisure clothes, worn at home by the emperor, the officials and by the appointed ladies of the court), especially those he, himself, had to wear when he was not engaged in official duties. Emperor Jiajing therefore sought the help of Grand Secretary Zhang Zong (1476–1539) to investigate the dress regulations which were governing the casual clothing in ancient time. Zhang Zong therefore consulted the Lishu and found out that the xuanduan was most widely worn in ancient times beside the formal court attire, mianfu; this led the Jiajing emperor to decree that the yanfu of both the emperor and the officials had to be modelled after the xuanduan:

There have never been clear regulations on the leisure dress of ranked officials, and followers of the outlandish compete in their eccentric dressing, thereby causing greater disorder. I beg that it be modelled on the ancient xuanduan and put in a separate statue to be disseminated throughout the empire, so that noble and base are distinguished.’ The emperor then ordered the creation of the ‘Illustrations of the Loyal and Tranquil Hat and Dress’, to be promulgated by the Board of Rites, together with an imperial edict stating, ‘The Ancestors learned from antiquity and established regulations, so that the court and sacri- ficial dress of ranked officials each had distinctions. But the ordinary people are more cautious toward that which is clear, negligent of that which is obscure. The ancient sage kings were attentive to this, and ordered the xuanduan as the leisure dress for officials. Recently clothing styles have been outlandish, with no distinc- tion between superior and inferior, so that the people’s proclivities are without restraints. Hence, we have consulted the regulations on the ancient xuanduan, and changed its name to the ‘Loyal and Tranquil’ [忠靖冠服; zhongjing guanfu], alluding to ‘Thinking of utmost loyalty when entering, thinking of amending one’s faults when retiring’. We have made pictures to instruct on the styles and construction. Officials in the capital above the seventh rank, members of the Hanlin Academy, the Imperial Academy, officials in the Messenger’s Office above the eighth rank; in the provinces, Regional Supervisors, Senior Officials of each prefecture, chief officials of each sub-prefecture and county, and the education officials of Confucian schools are to wear it. Military officials of the rank of commissioner-in-chief or above may wear it. The others are prohibited from exceeding the regulations

— Chen, BuYun, Wearing the Hat of Loyalty: Imperial Power and Dress Reform in Ming Dynasty China, 425-426

According to the new regulations, the emperor's xuanduan (yanbian guanfu, lit. 'Dress of the Casual Hat') was black (玄) in colour and was decorated with 143 dragons, including a large dragon medallion at the front of the garment; it was also decorated with a green trim border. The royal princes had to wear a green xuanduan which was decorated with a green trim and decorated with two ranks badges of dragon design (baohe guanfu, lit. 'Dress of Preserving Harmony'). The xuanduan used as the yanfu of the officials (忠靖冠服; zhongjing guanfu; 'Dress of Loyalty and Tranquility') were dark green in colour. Officials of the third rank and above had xuanduan decorated with cloud patterns while the xuanduan worn by the officials who ranked fourth and below wore plain xuanduan.

== Design and construction ==
The xuanduan is a form of Yichang, composed of an upper garment called yi and a lower garment called chang (skirt). According to the Rites of Zhou, the standard xuanduan had sleeves and body of equal size (two chi, two cun long) and the sleeve opening was made of one chi, two cun. It was made of a whole width of square fabric which was dyed black (or dark) in colour.

The colour of the skirt (chang) which matches with the upper garment varied depending on rank: i.e. Shi (士) officials of high rank wore black lower garment, middle-rank Shi officials wore yellow lower garment, while the low-rank Shi officials wore lower garment in motleys.

== Gallery ==
Illustration of Shi Yuanduan (士元端), from the illustration from the Chinese encyclopedia Gujin Tushu Jicheng, section "Ceremonial Usages"

Illustration of Yuanduan (元端), from the illustration from the Chinese encyclopedia Gujin Tushu Jicheng, section "Ceremonial Usages"

== See also ==
- Hanfu
- List of Hanfu
- Ruqun
- Pienfu
- Mianfu
