= List of hanfu =

List of traditional Han Chinese clothing

Hanfu are the historical clothing of the Han Chinese, here categorized by clothing style.

== Informal wear ==
Two traditional forms of ruqun (襦裙), a type of Han Chinese clothing worn primarily by women. Cuffs and sleeves on the upper garment may be tighter or looser depending on style. A short skirt or weighted braid (with weight provided by a jade or gold pendant) is sometimes worn to improve aesthetics or comfort of the basic ruqun.

Types include tops and bottoms, long skirt, and one-piece robes that wrap around the body once or several times (shenyi).

Zhongyi (中衣), which is usually the inner garment much like a Western T-shirt and pants, can be wear along in casual.

The typical set of informal wear consists of two or three layers. The first layer is mostly zhongyi (中衣). The next layer is the main layer which is mostly closed at the front. There can be an optional third layer which is often an overcoat called a zhaoshan which is open at the front.

For footwear, white socks and black cloth shoes (with white soles) are the norm. But in the past, shoes may have a front face panel attached to the tip of the shoes.

List of Inner garments
Romanization	Hanzi	Definition	Description	Period	Images
Zhōngyī	中衣				
Bàofù	抱腹			Han	
Dùdōu	肚兜, 兜肚, or 兜兜			Qing	
Héhuān Jīn	合欢襟	Chest covering that acts like a camisole. It covers the front and has strings in the back.		Yuan dynasty	
Liǎngdāng	两当	It is an underwear which is made up of a square-shaped back and front panels.	A form of hufu. It was introduced in the Central Plains by the nomads of China.	Wei and Jin	
Mǒxiōng	抹胸	A rectangular piece of cloth tied with strings to cover the breasts and give them support.		Song	
Xièyī	亵衣	A camisole that is in a rounded diamond shape and often embroidered, tied around the neck and around the lower back.		Pre-Han	
Xīnyī	心衣			Han	
Zhǔyāo	主腰			Ming	

List of informal wear
Romanization	Hanzi	Definition	Description	Period	Images
Zhíjū	直裾		Straight lapelled, full body garment.	Pre-Qin – Han	
Qūjū	曲裾		Diagonal body wrapped, full body garment.	Pre-Qin – Han	
Kùzhě	裤褶	Clothing with trousers for riding or military style clothing.	A short coat with trousers.	Pre-Qin – Ming.	
Páofú	袍服				
Yèsāpáo	曳撒 or 一撒		A form of kuzhe.	Ming	
Zhì sūn fú or yisefu	质孙服 or 一色服	"robe of one colour"	Introduced in Yuan; later became a uniform for the military officials Ming.	Yuan – Ming	
Rúqún	襦裙	"Jacket and skirt"	An upper garment covered by a separate skirt. A common clothing for women.	Pre-Qin – Modern	
Ǎoqún/ Shānqún	袄裙/衫裙		A short coat with a long skirt underneath. A common clothing for women.	Han – Modern	
Zhíduō	直裰	Straight robe.	Similar to zhiju but with vents at sides and cuffed sleeves. A common attire for men.	Tang – Ming	
Zhíduō	直裰	Straight robe.	Similar to zhiju but with vents at sides and cuffed sleeves. A common attire for men.	Modern	
Dàopáo	道袍	Taoist robe.	Worn by Taoist priests and normal scholars.	Song – Modern	
Shuǐtiányī	水田衣			Ming-Qing	
Bǎijiāyī	百家衣			Liu Song – Modern	

== Semi-formal wear ==
Generally, this form of wear is suitable for meeting guests or going to meetings and other special cultural days. This form of dress is often worn by the nobility or the upper-class as they are often expensive pieces of clothing, usually made of silks and damasks. The coat sleeves are often deeper than the shenyi to create a more voluminous appearance.

A piece of ancient Chinese clothing can be "made semi-formal" by the addition of the following appropriate items:

- Chang (裳): a pleated skirt
- Bixi (蔽膝): a cloth attached from the waist, covering front of legs.
- Zhaoshan (罩衫): long open fronted coat

List of semi-formal wear
Romanization	Hanzi	Definition	Period	Images
Banbi	半臂	A half-sleeved waistcoat.	Tang – Ming	
Bijia	比甲	An open-sided vest.	Ming	
Beizi or Hechang	褙子 or 鹤氅	Large loose outer coat with loose and long sleeves	Song – Ming	

== Formal wear ==
In addition to informal and semi-formal wear, there is a form of dress that is worn only at confucian rituals, important sacrifices, religious activities or by special people who are entitled to wear them (such as officials and emperors).

The most formal dress civilians can wear is the xuanduan (sometimes called yuanduan 元端), which consists of a black or dark blue top garment that runs to the knees with long sleeve (often with white piping), a bottom red chang, a red bixi (which can have a motif and/or be edged in black), an optional white belt with two white streamers hanging from the side or slightly to the front called peishou(佩綬), and a long black guan. Additionally, wearers may carry a long jade gui (圭) or wooden hu (笏) tablet (used when greeting royalty). This form of dress is mostly used in sacrificial ceremonies such as Ji Tian (祭天) and Ji Zu (祭祖), etc., but is also appropriate for state occasions. The xuanduan is basically a simplified version of full court dress of the officials and the nobility.

List of formal wear
Romanization	Hanzi	Definition	Period	Images
Xuanduan/ Yuanduan	玄端/ 元端	Literally "dark solemn", a very formal dark robe.	Pre-Qin – Song	
Shenyi	深衣	A long full body garment.	Pre-Qin – Ming	
Yuanlingshan/ Panlingpao	圓領衫/盤領袍	Closed round-collared robe. Mostly used for official occasions.	Sui – Ming	
Lanshan	襴衫	Closed round-collared robe with black edges. Mostly used for academical dress; worn by scholars and students (生員) taking the imperial examination.	Tang – Ming	
Daxiushan	大袖衫	Large Sleeve Gown. Worn by royal women.	Five dynasties – Tang	
Chang'ao	長襖	A long overcoat	Ming	
Zaju chuishao fu or Guiyi	杂裾垂髾服 or 袿衣	A formal dress worn by Elite women.	Cao Wei to Northern and Southern dynasties	

== Court dress ==
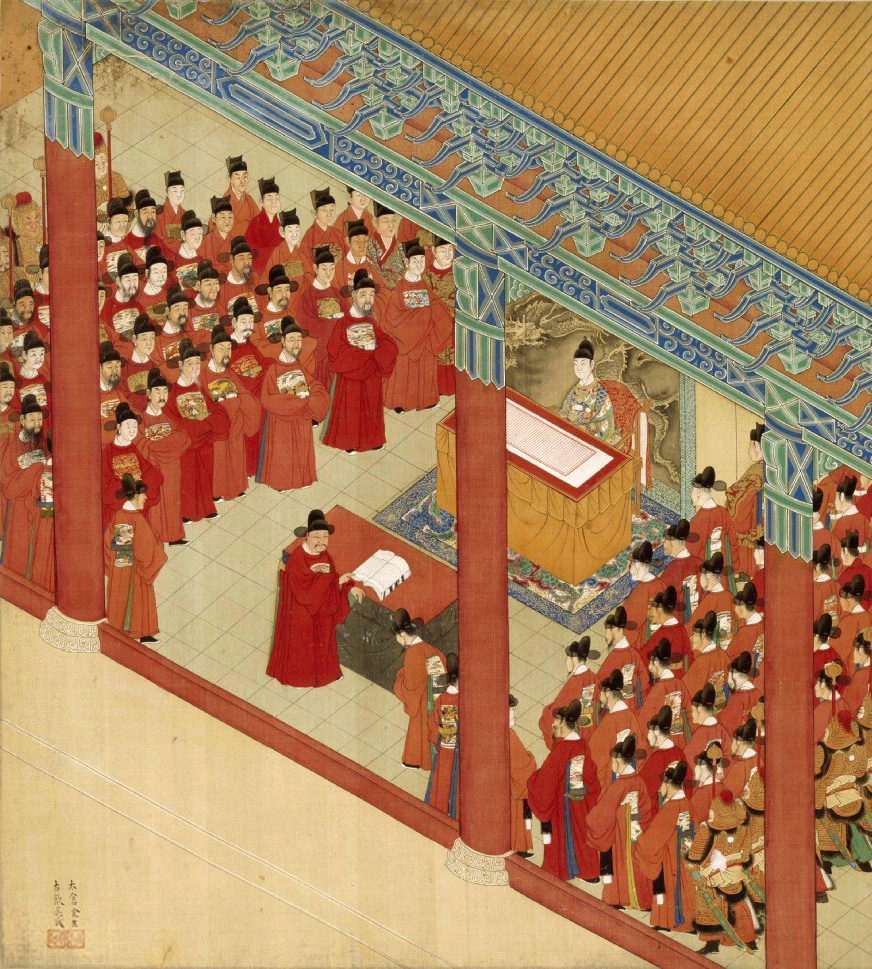
Government officials in Changfu during the Wanli era, Ming dynasty

Court dress is the dress worn at very formal occasions and ceremonies that are in the presence of a monarch (such as an enthronement ceremony). The entire ensemble of clothing can consist of many complex layers and look very elaborate. Court dress is similar to the xuanduan in components but have additional adornments and elaborate headwear. They are often brightly colored with vermillion and blue. There are various versions of court dress that are worn for certain occasions. The practical use of court dress is now obsolete in the modern age since there is no reigning monarch in China anymore.

Those in academia or officialdom have distinctive gowns (known as changfu 常服 in court dress terms). This varies over the ages but they are typically round collared gowns closed at the front. The most distinct feature is the headgear which has 'wings' attached. Only those who passed the civil examinations are entitled to wear them, but a variation of it can be worn by ordinary scholars and laymen and even for a groom at a wedding (but with no hat).

=== Court dress of emperors ===
Court dress of Emperors
Romanization		Hanzi	Definition	Period	Images
Longpao (龙袍)	Jifu	吉服	The dragon robe for special occasions.	Shang – Ming	
Longpao (龙袍)	Changfu	常服	The dragon robe for daily wear.	Tang – Qing	
Mianfu		冕服	Attire worn by emperors and crown princes.	Shang – Ming	
Tongtianguanfu		通天冠服	Tongtian, literally means "direct links with heaven". Ceremonial dress.	Shang – Ming	
Bianfu		弁服	Occasional court dress. Also worn by officials or the nobility.	Shang – Ming	

=== Court dress of officials ===
Court dress of Officials: Guanfu (官服)
Romanization	Hanzi	Definition	Period	Images
Chaofu	朝服	A red ceremonial court dress of emperor, officials or nobility.	Zhou – Ming	
Gongfu	公服	Formal court dress according to ranks.	Tang – Ming	
Changfu	常服	Everyday court dress.	Song – Qing	
Bufu	补服	Changfu sewn with Mandarin square.	Ming – Qing	
Zhongjingfu	忠静服	Retired official's bufu with same colour long cloth belt.	Ming	
Cifu	賜服	Ceremonial court dress of the highest rank officials. The right to wear such dress was bestowed by emperors as a special honour.	Ming – Qing	
Mangfu	蟒服	Also known as the "four-clawed dragon" robe or "python robe". It is a type of Cifu.	Ming-Qing	
Feiyufu	飞鱼服	Also known as "flying fish" robe. It is a type of Cifu.	Ming	
Douniufu	斗牛服	Also known as "fighting bull" robe. It is a type of Cifu.	Ming	

Official Dress Codes of Officials in Ming Dynasty
Precedence	Rank	Robe Color	Animal on Patch (Civil)	Animal on Patch (Military)	Exemplified Positions (Not All-Inclusive)
1st (Highest)	First Rank Primary 正一品		Red-crowned crane	Lion	Emperor's Chief Advisor 太師 Regional Commander 都督
2nd	First Rank Secondary 從一品		Red-crowned crane	Lion	Emperor's Assistant 少傅 Regional Executive Officer 都督同知
3rd	Second Rank Primary 正二品		Golden pheasant	Lion	Crown Prince's Teaching Assistant太子少師 Secretary of Defense 兵部尚書
4th	Second Rank Secondary 從二品		Golden pheasant	Lion	Governor 布政使 Provincial Deputy Commander 都指揮同知
5th	Third Rank Primary 正三品		Peacock	Tiger	Mayor of Beijing 順天府尹 Deputy Secretary of Labor 工部侍郎
6th	Third Rank Secondary 從三品		Peacock	Tiger	Minister of the Imperial Stud 太僕寺卿 Minister of Salt Supply 都轉鹽運使
7th	Fourth Rank Primary 正四品		Wild goose	Leopard	(Eunuch Position) Handler of the Imperial Seal 掌印太監 Minister of Foreign Affairs 鴻臚寺卿
8th	Fourth Rank Secondary 從四品		Wild goose	Leopard	Principal of the Imperial Academy 國子監祭酒 Governor's Junior Assistant 參議
9th	Fifth Rank Primary 正五品		Silver pheasant	Bear	Principal of the Imperial Medical Academy 太醫院使 Grand Secretary of the Cabinet 内閣大學士
10th	Fifth Rank Secondary 從五品		Silver pheasant	Bear	Junior Scholar at the Imperial Library 翰林院侍讀學士 Deputy Manager of the Department of Justice 刑部員外郎
11th	Sixth Rank Primary 正六品		Egret	Panther	(Female Position) Manager of Royal House Records 司記 Minister of Buddhist Affairs 僧錄司善世
12th	Sixth Rank Secondary 從六品		Egret	Panther	Deputy Mayor 同知 Deputy Manager of Minority Affairs 安撫司副使
13th	Seventh Rank Primary 正七品		Mandarin duck	Panther	Auditor of the Supreme Court 大理寺評事 Investigating censor 監察御史
14th	Seventh Rank Secondary 從七品		Mandarin duck	Panther	Monitor of the Six Ministries 給事中 Deputy Ambassador 行人司左司副
15th	Eighth Rank Primary 正八品		Oriole	Rhinoceros	Accountant at the Department of Finance 戶部照磨 Deputy County Administrator 縣丞
16th	Eighth Rank Secondary 從八品		Oriole	Rhinoceros	Assistant Priest at the Ministry of Imperial Sacrifices 太常寺祀丞 Supervisor at the Ministry of Royal Food Service 光祿寺監事
17th	Ninth Rank Primary 正九品		Quail	A horse in the sea (not seahorse)	Chief Servant at the Ministry of Royal Theatres 教坊司奉鑾 Chief Officer at the Headquarter of Official Travels 會同館大使
18th (Lowest)	Ninth Rank Secondary 從九品		Quail	A horse in the sea (not seahorse)	Warden 司獄 Marshal 巡檢

=== Court dress for women ===
Court dress of Woman
Romanization	Hanzi	Definition	Period	Images
Huidi-yi	褘翟衣	Attire worn by empresses and crown princesses.	Zhou – Ming	
Dashanxiapei	大衫霞帔	The large gown with the radiance hanging scarf. Ceremonial court dress of empresses and mìngfu.	Song- Ming	
Changfu	常服	Everyday court dress of mìngfu.	Ming	
Bufu	补服	Changfu sewn with Mandarin square. Ceremonial court dress of mìngfu.	Ming	

== Cloaks ==
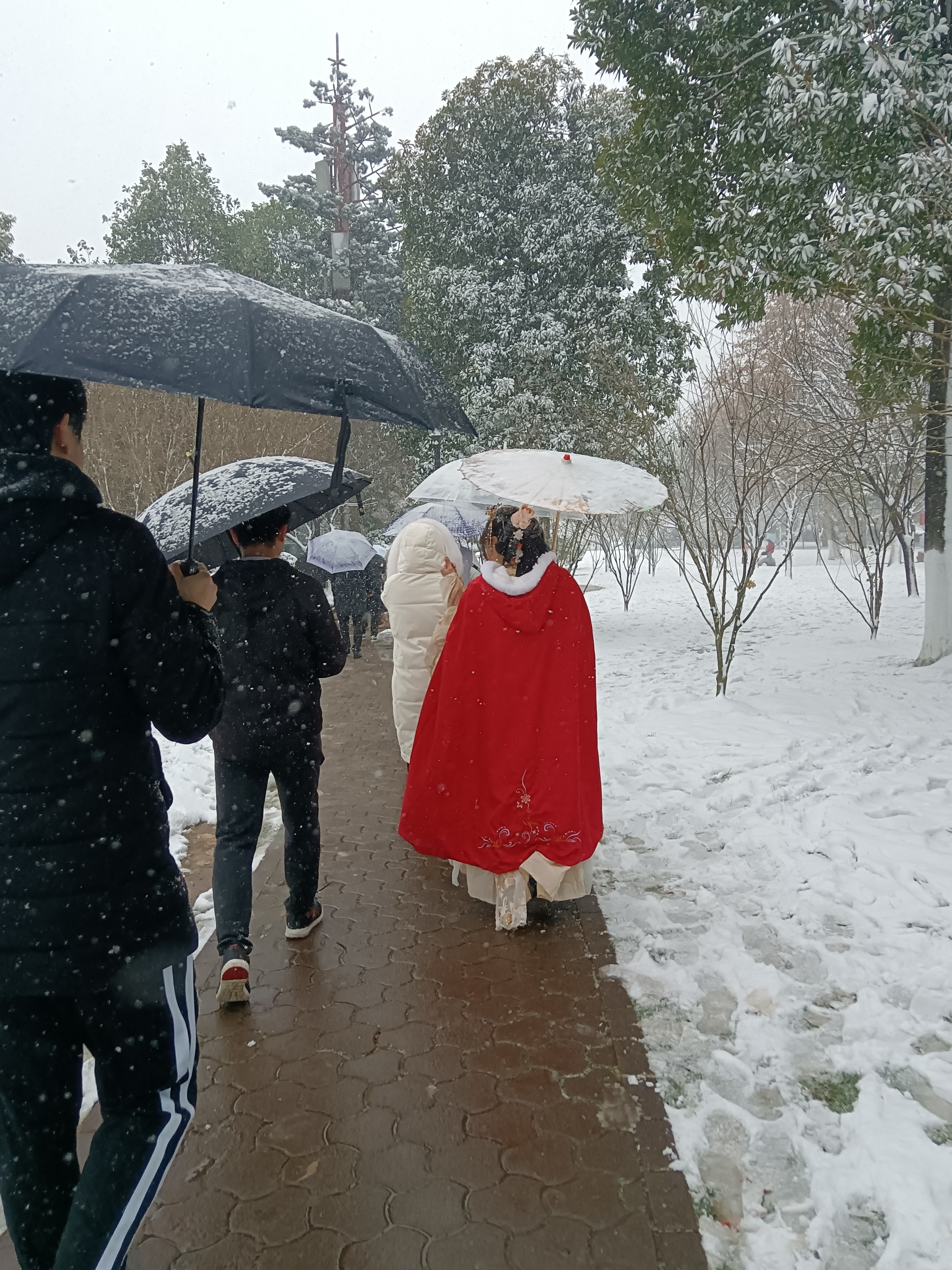
Doupeng (斗篷), a cloak

== Lower garments ==
Types of Women's skirts
Romanization	Hanzi	Definition	Description	Period	Images
Chang/ Shang	裳		A narrow, ankle-length skirt.	Shang – Ming	
Bixi	蔽膝	"Knee cover"	Apron-like lower garment	Shang - Ming	
Shou	绶	"Seal cord"		Zhou - Ming	
Liuxianqun	留仙裙	"Fairy skirt".		Han	
Jianqun or Jiansequn	间裙 or 间色裙	Stripped skirts.	It was a high waisted skirts which integrated both the techniques of the Han dynasty and foreign techniques from the Western Region. In the Sixteen kingdoms, the skirt had panels of different colours; which could vary to: 6, 8, 12 regions. From the Northern dynasty to the Tang dynasty, the skirt had denser multiple stripes. In Tang, the stripped skirt was A-line.	Wei, Jin, Northern and Southern dynasties – Tang dynasty	
Bainiaoqun	百鸟裙	"Hundred bird-feather skirt".	A feather skirt worn by a princess in Mid-Tang; the skirt was made with the feathers from a hundred birds.	Tang	
Shiliuqun	石榴裙	"Pomegranate skirt"	A red skirt which was very popular.	Tang	
Yujinqun	郁金裙	"Turmeric skirt"	A yellow skirt which was dyed with turmeric.	Tang	
Liangpianqun	两片裙		An unpleated skirt which is composed of two pieces of fabric sewn to the same waistband. The middle part of the skirt overlap and are not sewn together.	Song	
Baidiequn	百迭裙		A one-piece pleated skirt; the top is narrow and the bottom is wide.	Song	
Sanjianqun	三裥裙		A skirt made of 4 skirts pieces sewn together.	Song	
Zhejianqun	褶裥裙	"Folded skirt"		Song	
Mamianqun	马面裙	"Horse-face skirt".	A skirt made of two-pieces of fabric sewn to the same waistband. The sides of the skirt has knife pleats whereas the back and front have flat panels.	Ming-Qing	
Baijianqun	百襇裙	"Hundred pleated skirt".		Qing	
Yuehuaqun	月華裙	"Moonlight skirt".	Made of ten pieces of fabric which was then tucked in 10 pleats; each pleats had a different colour which was light. It was a popular skirt in the early Qing dynasty.	Qing	
Yulinqun	鱼鳞裙	Lit. "fish-scale" skirt.	A skirt where pleats were joined with silk threads in order to makes creases which look like the scales of a fish. The pleats were very tiny.	Qing	
		"Rainbow skirt".		Qing	
Langanqun	襕干裙	"Chinese ink painting skirt".	A skirt where scattered flowers pattern were printed.	Qing	
Fengweiqun	凤尾裙	Lit. "Phoenix-tail skirt".	An underskirt which is decorated with long ribbons of different colours of silk, the ribbons were narrow. Different embroidery is found on in each ribbon strips. It was popular during the reign of Kangxi and Qianlong.	Qing	
Baizhequn	百摺裙		An all-around small pleated skirt.	Qing – Republic	

== Religious clothing ==
Those in the religious orders wear a plain middle layer garment followed by a highly decorated cloak or coat. Taoists have a 'scarlet gown' (絳袍) which is made of a large square-shaped cloak sewn at the hem to create very long deep sleeves used in very formal rituals. They are often scarlet or crimson in colour with wide edging and embroidered with intricate symbols and motifs such as the eight trigrams and the yin and yang Taiji symbol.

Buddhist have a cloak with gold lines on a scarlet background creating a brickwork pattern which is wrapped around over the left shoulder and secured at the right side of the body with cords. There may be further decorations, especially for high priests.

Daoists, Buddhists and Confucians may have white stripe chevrons.

Types of Religious Clothing
Name		Hanzi	Definition	Description	Period	Images
Fusha or Haiqing		彿裟 or 海青	"sea-blue".	Buddhist priests' full dress ceremonial robes. It is also worn by Zhenyi priests in Taiwan; it is blue in colour.		
Fayi (法衣); "ritual clothing"	Jiangyi or Jiangpao	絳衣 or 絳袍	"Robe of descent", or "scarlet robe".	A square-shaped poncho-like upper outer garment; the square symbolizes the earth which is perceived as square in Chinese cosmology. It has motifs such as the sun, moon, Three heavens, stars and constellations, Sacred (golden) tower and flying cranes, Wu yue, Mountain peaks and cosmic waters. It is worn by high ranking taoist priests, e.g. Grandmasters. It is a formal outfit worn during Taoist ceremonies.	Ming- Present	
Fayi (法衣); "ritual clothing"	Huayi	花衣	"Flowery robe"	It is a ritual robe, worn under the jiangyi. It is well decorated with motif, such as dragons, clouds, mountains, cranes and the seven stars Dipper. It is worn by seniors and high ranking taoist priests.	Unknown- Present	
Fayi (法衣); "ritual clothing"	Banyi	班衣	"Colourful robe"	It is a ritual robe; it can have embroidered borders but the clothing is typically monochrome, mostly red in colour. It is worn for during daily recitations of scriptures in a worship hall before divinities.	Unknown – Present	
Daopao		道袍	"Taoist robe" or "Robe of the Dao"	It is worn by middle-rank Taoist priests. Colour is dependant on the rank of the priest, and is covered with decorations, such as bagua and cranes.	Unknown – Present	
Daoyi		道衣	"Taoist robe" or "Robe of the Dao"	A wide-sleeved, cross-collared gown worn by Taoist priests and nuns; it is a standard type of clothing.	Unknown- Present	
De luo		得罗		An indigo formal ritual clothing, worn by Taoism priests in the Quanzhen order; the blue colour is a symbolism for the East. It is cross-collared.	Unknown – Present	
Da gua		大褂	"Great gown"	It is a common type of informal, daily clothing worn by Taoists; in present days, it is mostly narrow-sleeved and blue in colour.	Unknown – Present	
Jieyi		戒衣	"Precept robes" or "ordination robes"	It is a large sleeved, monochrome yellow-coloured, cross-collar robe with black trims.	Unknown- Present	

== Handwear ==
=== Gloves and mitts ===
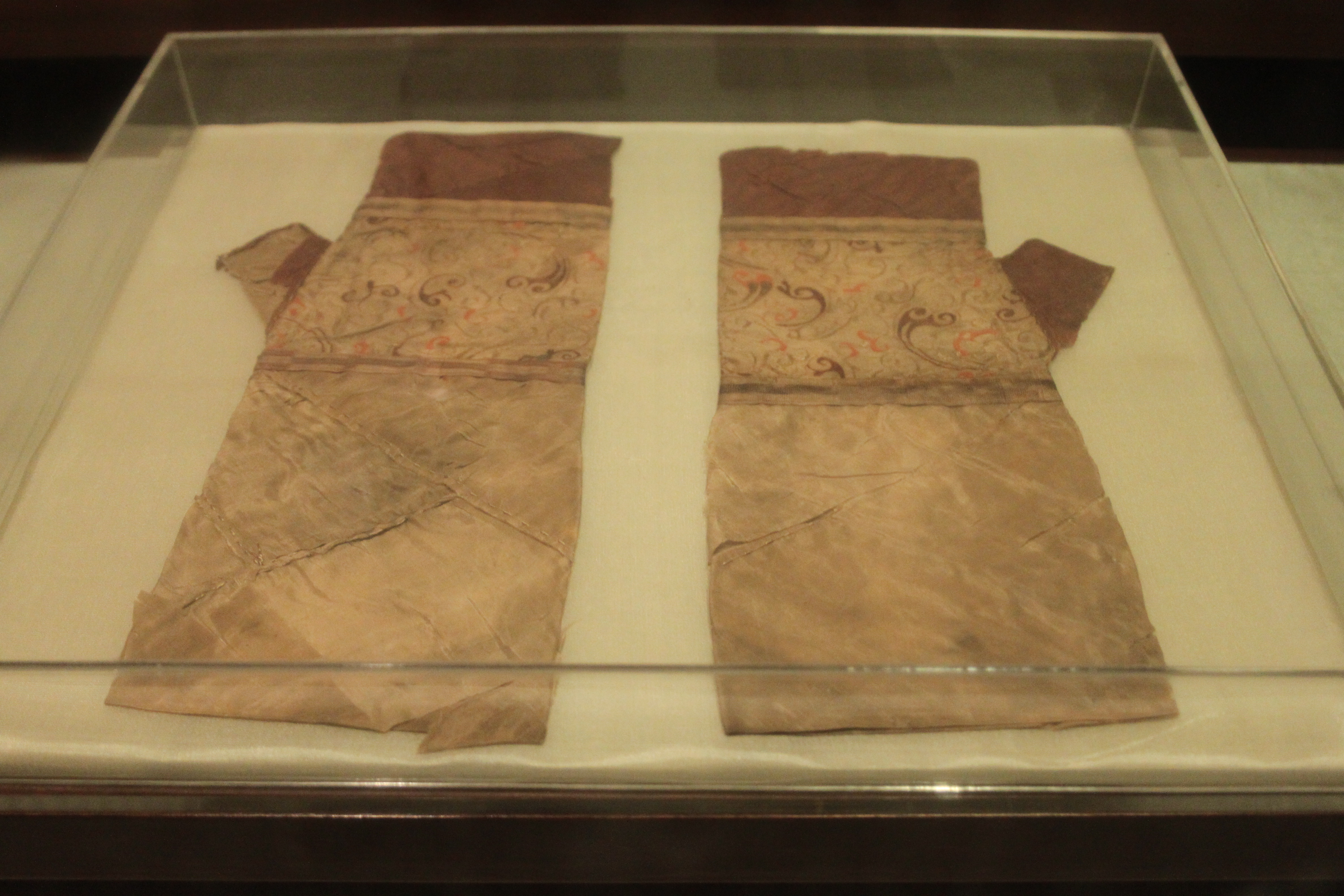
Han mitts, Mawangdui Tomb, Han dynasty.

== See also ==
- Chinese academic dress
- Chinese auspicious ornaments in textile and clothing
- Garment collars in hanfu
- Hanfu
- Hanfu accessories
- Hanfu footwear
- List of hanfu headwear
- Mandarin square
