= Chinese ornamental gold silk =

Chinese textile ornaments using gold on silk fabric

Chinese ornamental gold silk is a type of silk fabric which employs gold as ornamentation; Chinese ornamental gold silk originated in China and have a long history in China. Gold and silk were precious goods; the combination of both in textiles created one of the most valuable commodities. Several gold-ornamental techniques can be summarized as: gold foil (gold leaf), gold powder, and gold thread technique.

== History ==
Silk originated in China approximately 2000 years ago, prior to the use of gold. The use of gold is found in the Lower Xiajiadian culture and the Siba culture, which can be dated to about 3600 years ago. However, the combination of gold and silk appeared relatively late, and depended on the craft-making development of gold, especially that of gold wire. Prior to the Western Han dynasty, only the Emperor and the aristocracy were permitted to wear the highest grade silk textiles.

=== Gold foil technique ===
Due its physical properties, gold can be turned into very thin foil, also known as gold leaf or leaf gold, and twisted into wires. Techniques for applying adhesive and gold leaf to the surface of a silk foundation fabric existed before the Tang dynasty. A 2016 study suggested that the use of gold foil and thread in silk weaving appeared as early as the Shang dynasty after gold foil of 0.010 mm on the micrometer scale was unearthed in the Yin Ruins in Anyang. Items showing the addition of gold foil to a silk foundation were found in an Eastern Han dynasty tomb, which dates the technique to the Eastern Han dynasty. (Note: A red ribbon adorned with gold foil, wound around a silk pocket, was found in an Eastern Han tomb; a row of adherent gold foils, on a beige checkered ribbon, covered an iron mirror.)

Gold foil ornaments on silk clothing are found in unearthed artifacts of the Song dynasty; for example, the tomb of Huang Sheng, of the Southern Song dynasty, has silk blouses decorated with gold foil patterns. The foil-on-silk technique continued to be used in the Mongol period and in the Yuan dynasty.

The making of gold foil is recorded in Heavenly Creations《天工开物》 written by Song Yingxing of the Ming dynasty. Gold foil is attached to silk by using an adhesive, usually lacquer. The gold foil is then applied onto the silk with bamboo pliers.

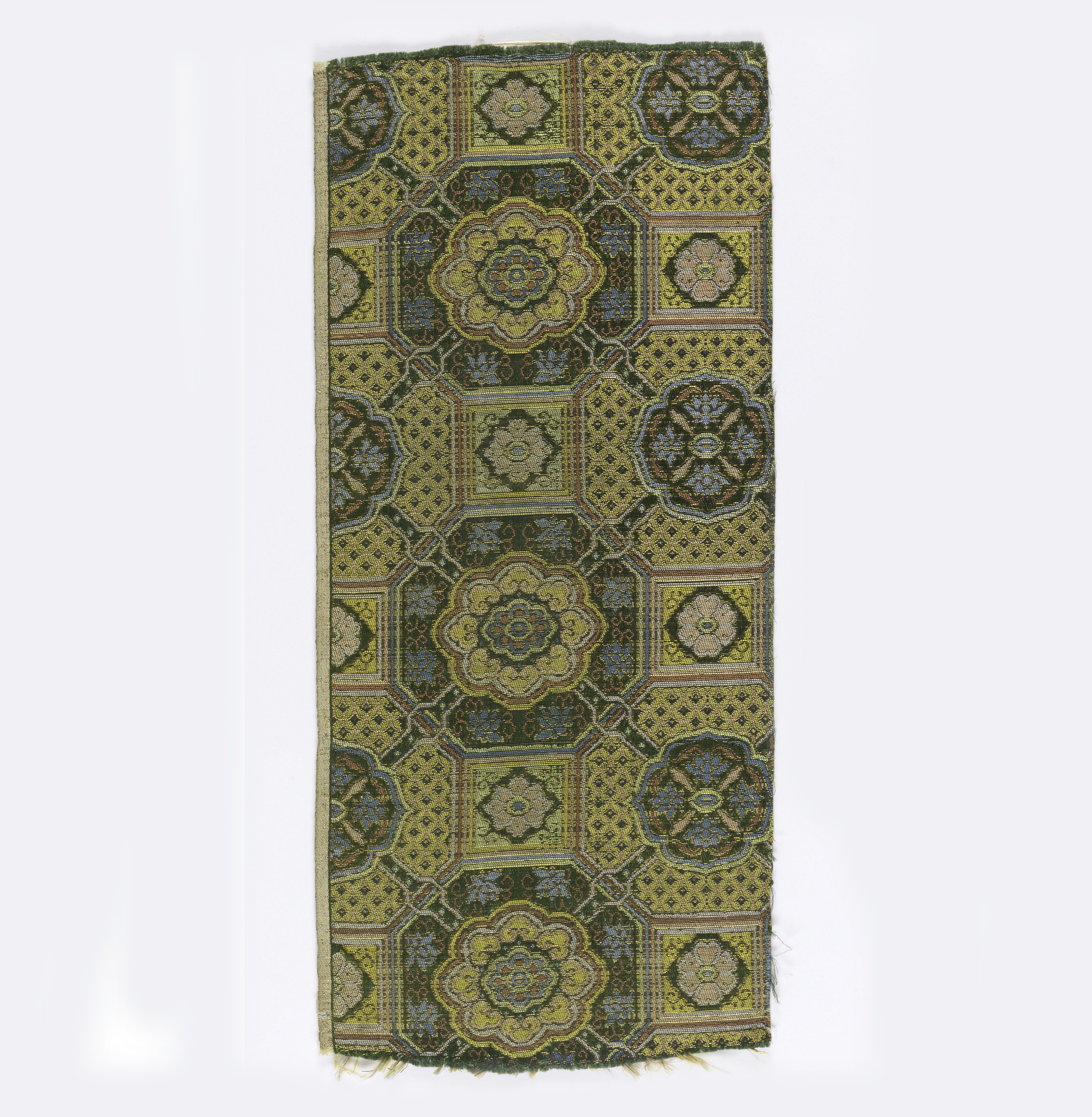
Textile; silk, paper with applied gold foil, 19th century.

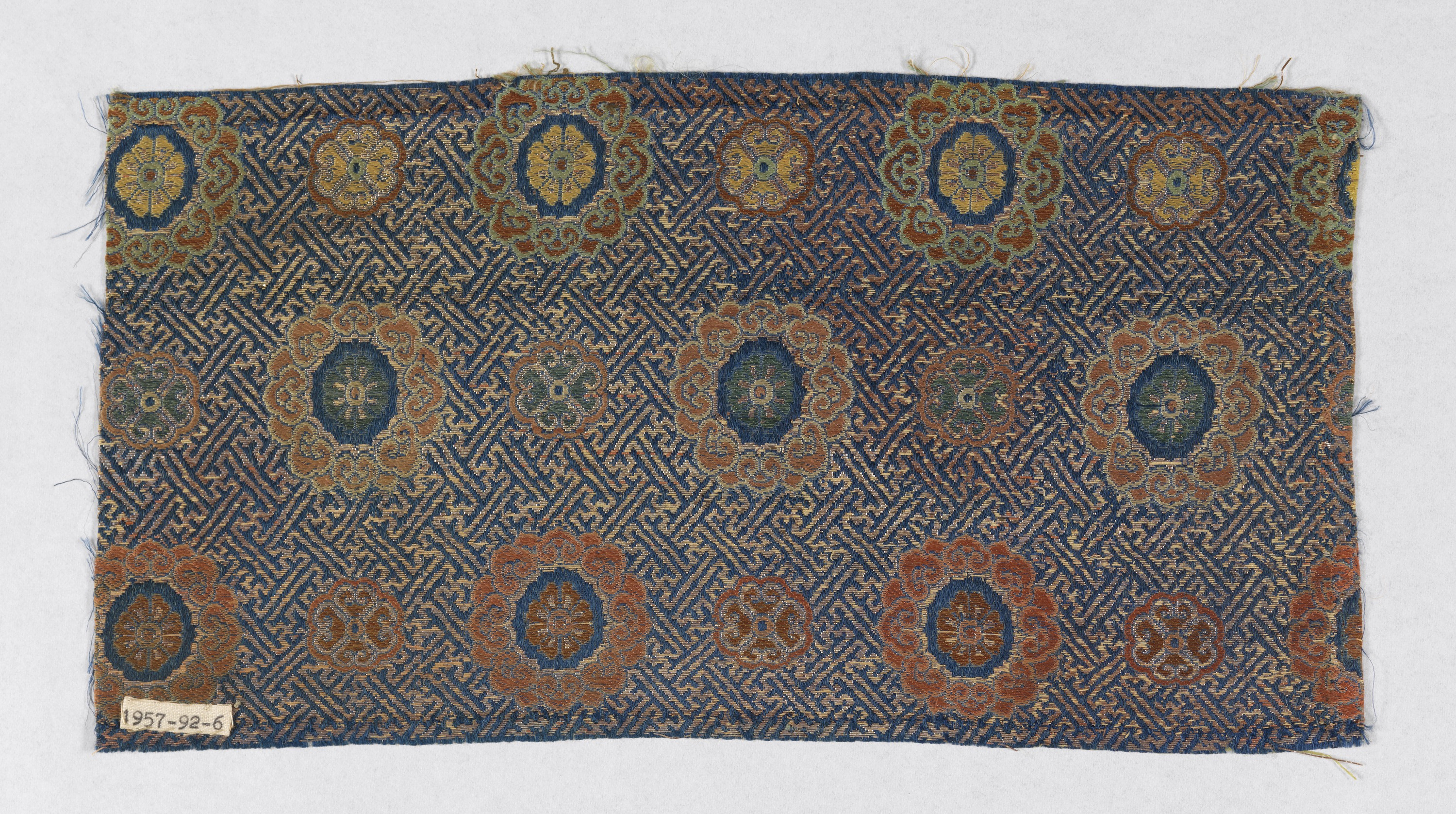
Textile; silk, paper with applied gold foil, 19th century

=== Gold powder technique ===
Gold powder was also used in the printing of silk in ancient China. Gold powder originated first, and was used later than gold foil. After manufacture, gold powder is mixed with a suitable binder before being applied to the surface of silk yarns (Note: Another method of making gold thread.) or fabrics.

Gold powder was used as early as the 2nd century AD. The alchemist Hu Gangzi, of the Eastern Han dynasty, is claimed to have invented the technique, as recorded in Chu jin Kuang Tu Lu. Silk fabric metallized with gold powder was unearthed from Tomb 1 at the Mawangdui site.

Gold metallization of silk was also used in the Tang dynasty. A pattern was applied to silk using an adhesive, the pattern then metallized with gold powder. Clothing decorated with gold-powder-printed patterns (also known as painting with gold techniques) was also found in the Southern dynasty tomb of Huang Sheng. Silver powder adornment of textiles used the same technique.

=== Gold thread technique ===
Gold thread was developed later and can be found in different forms: gold wire (made only of gold), gold-wrapped thread (typically a core yarn of silk wrapped with a strip of high-content gold foil), and yarn which is coated with gold powder. The making of gold threads through the gilding of animal or vegetate substrates appears to have originated in China.

==== Gold wire ====
There is also a gold wire technique called 'flat gold' (Chinese: 片金線; pinyin: piànjīnxiàn; lit. 'flat gold thread'), which involved immersing bamboo paper in water, putting gold foil on the paper after brushing a layer of fish gelatin on it, calendaring the gold paper foils on a board with cobbles to improve the gloss, and, finally, cutting the gold foil into long ribbons.

==== Gold-wrapped thread ====
The use of gold-wrapped thread has been found as early as the Wei and Jin periods on tomb murals. (Note: Earliest gold-wrapped threads in China are found in Sinkiang, one of them is from the Wei-Jin mural tombs in the Hexi Corridor region; the other is found in the Shanpula Tomb in Luopuu County. Both are estimated to have been produced about 1660–1700 years ago.) There is also evidence of gold threads in the Sui and Tang dynasties, including gilded and gold-leafed threads. Gold- and silver-gilded threads continued to be used in luxurious silk textiles in the Song, Liao, Jin dynasty and during the Mongol period.

In the Song dynasty, the weaving of textiles (jin 錦) brocaded with gold thread was widespread. Gilded threads using a paper substrate were typically associated with that dynasty, while those using animal substrate were associated with artisans of Northern China, and the Liao and Jin territories. Nianjin (撚金 lit. "twisted gold") refers to a type of gold thread in which flat strips of gilding are wound around a core of silk yarn whereas in pijin (皮金 lit. "leather gold"), an animal substrate is used.

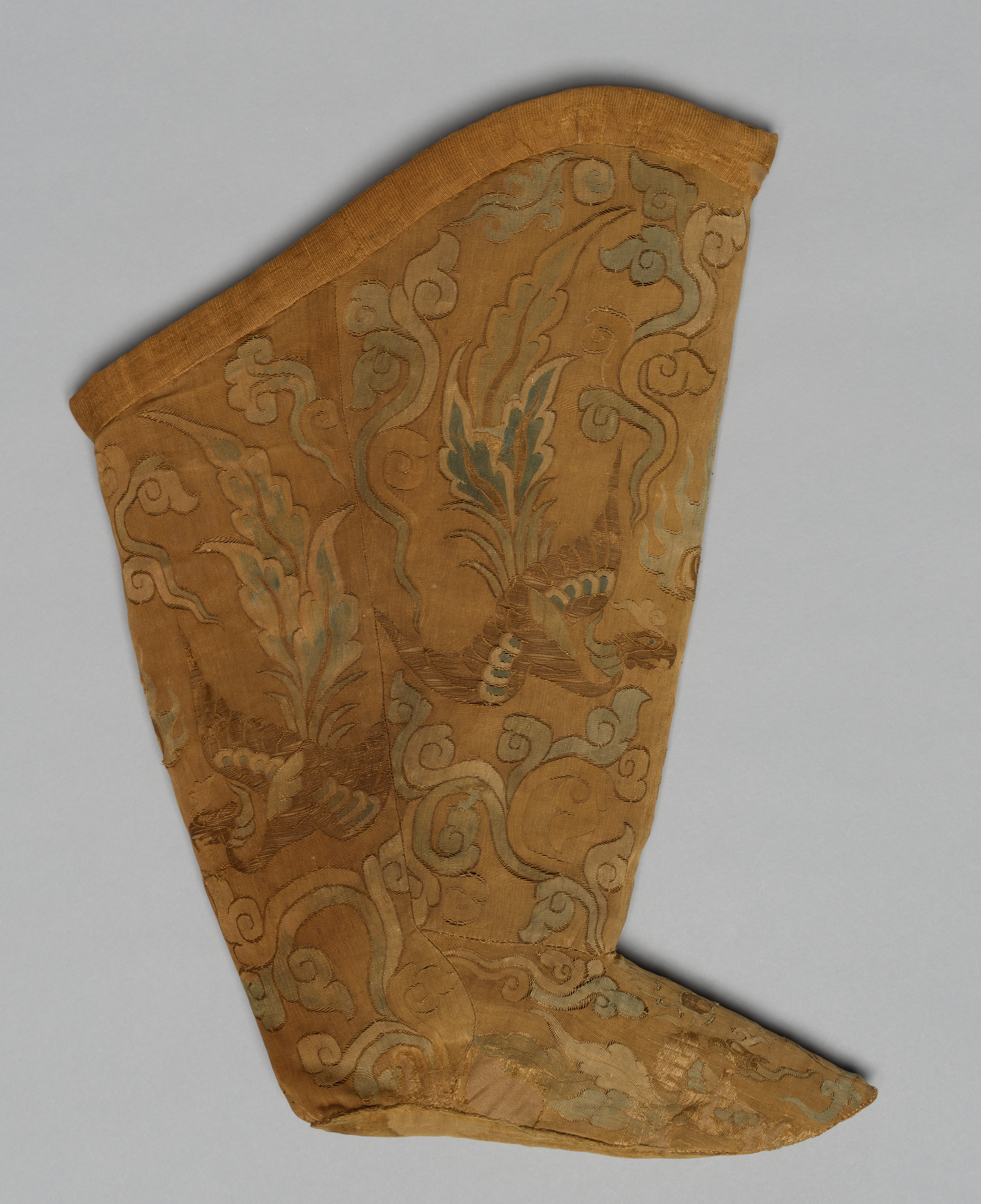
Imperial Boots Outer fabric: tapestry (kesi); silk and gold threads, Liao dynasty

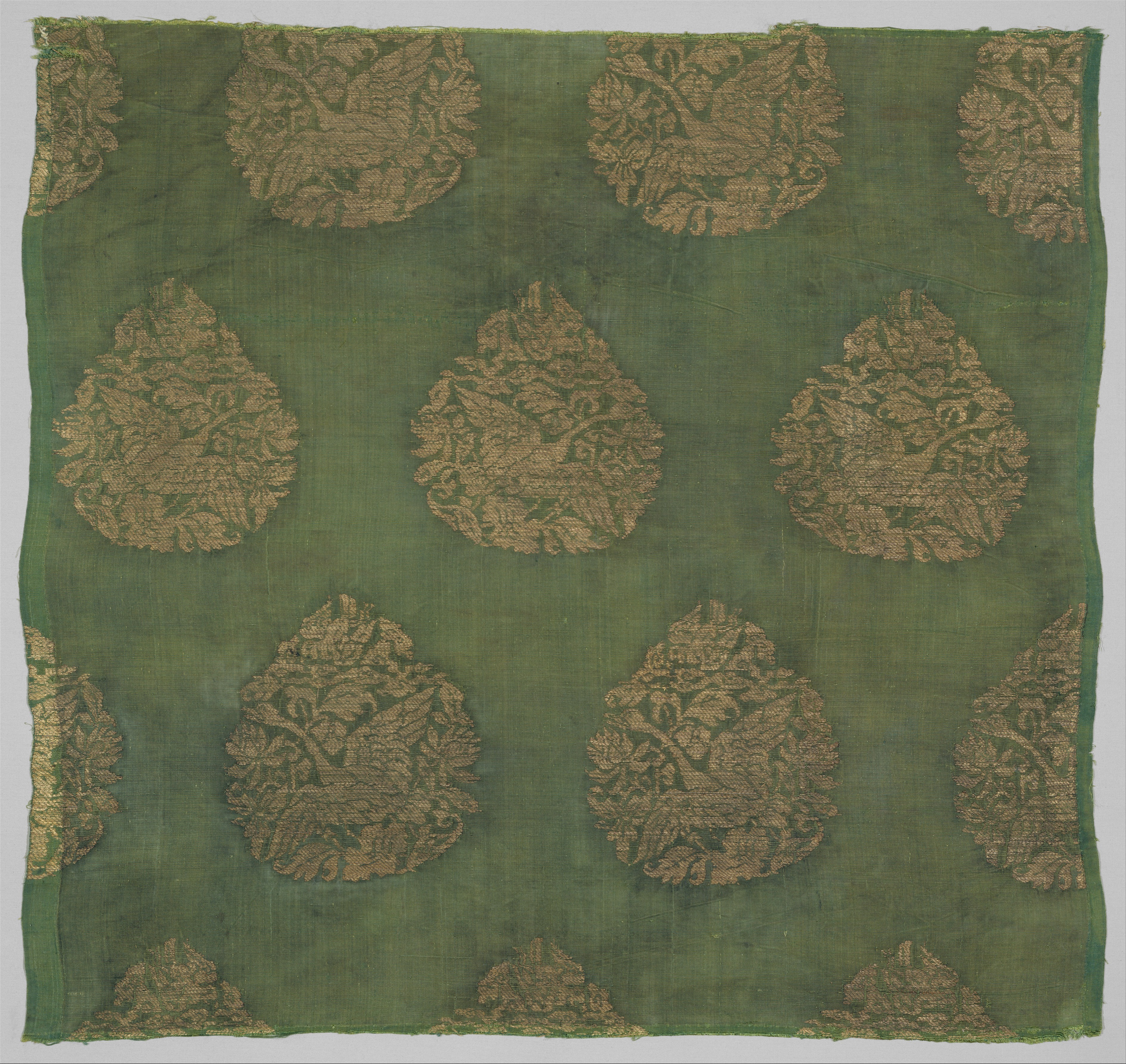
Plain-weave silk brocaded with gold-leaf-wrapped leather strips, Jin dynasty.

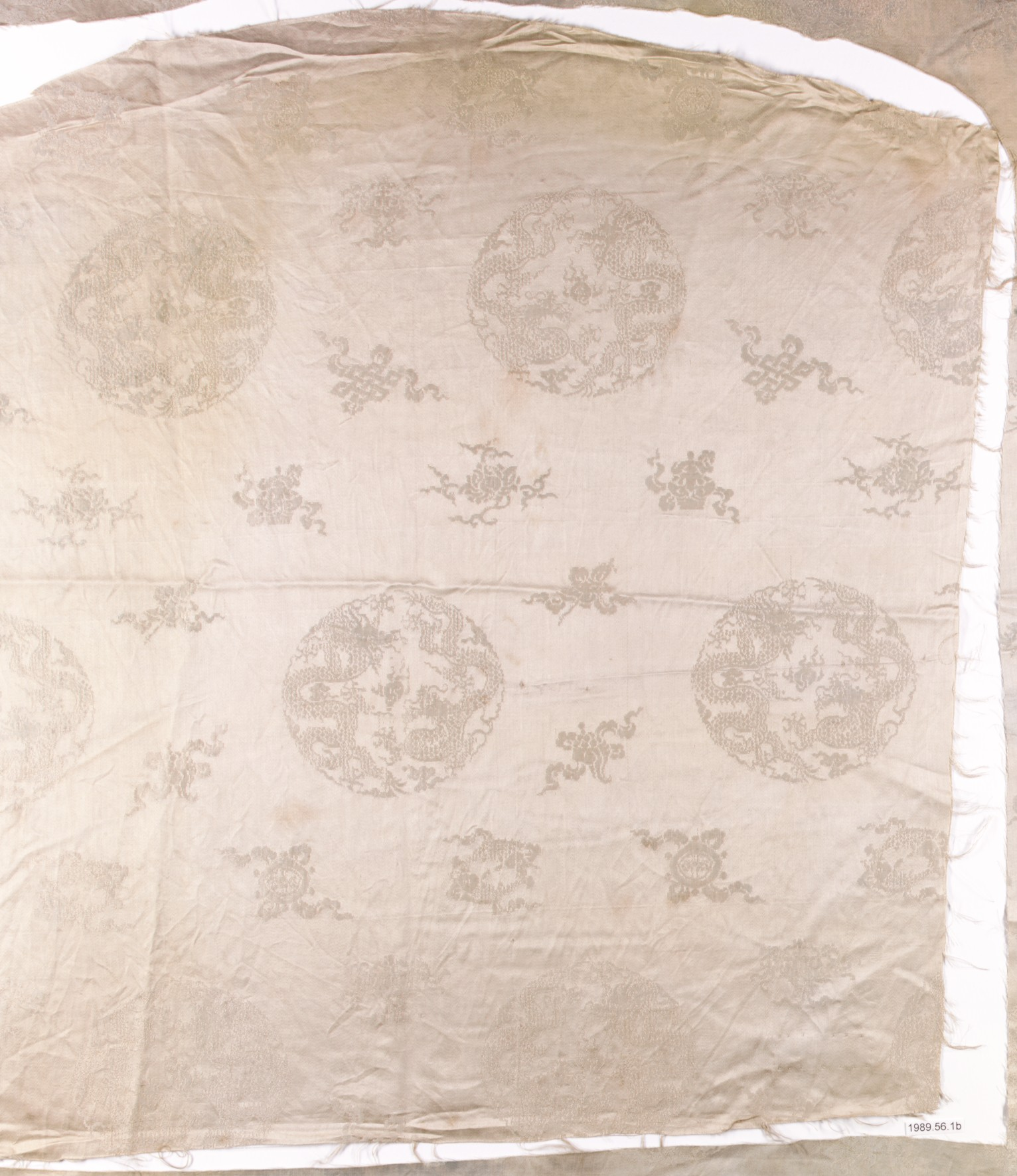
Satin damask and satin brocaded in silk and gold-wrapped silk, early 18th century

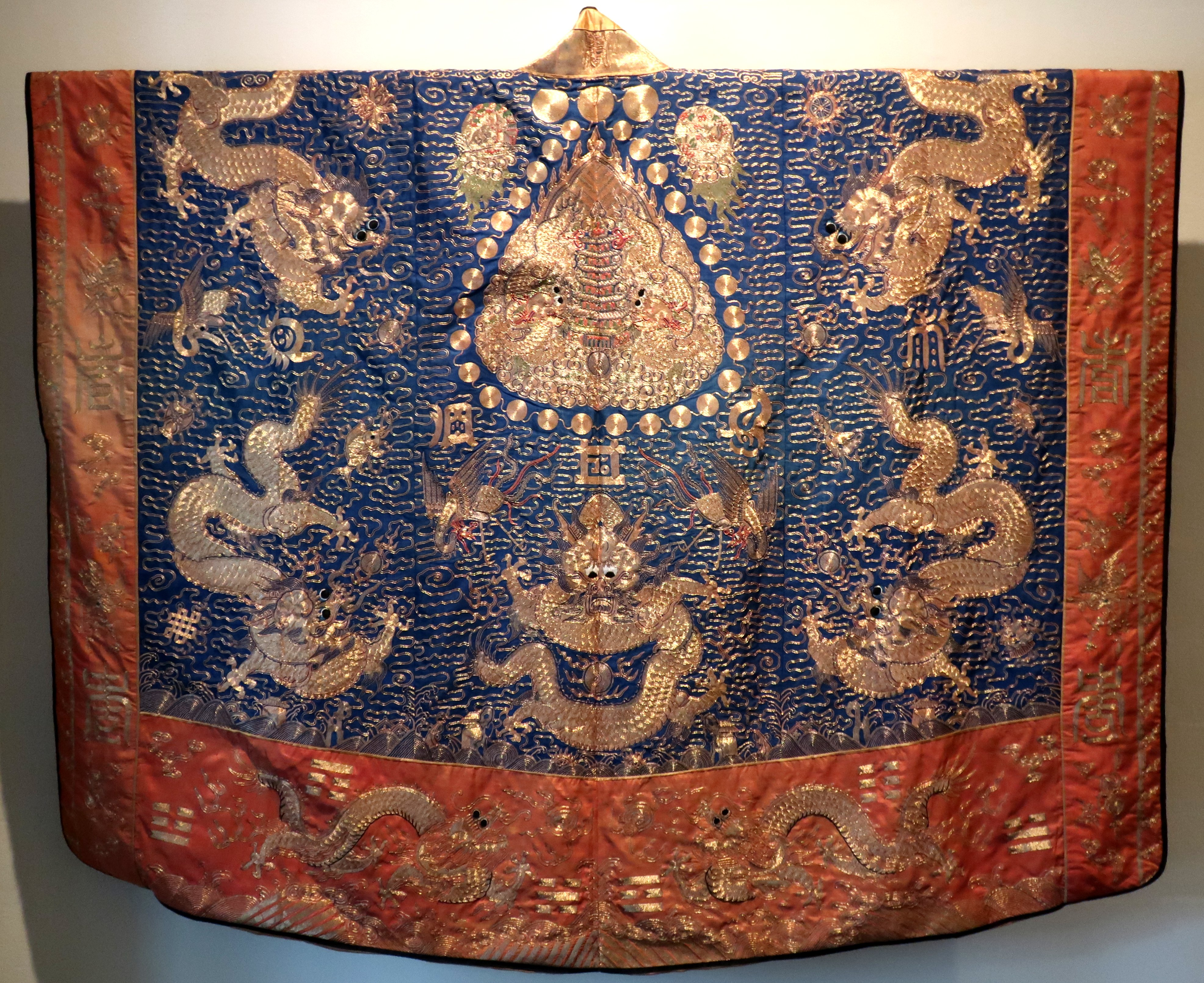
Daoist priest's robe made of silk, gold-paper-wrapped thread, plain and satin weave, 20th century.

==== Development of nasij ====
In Tang silks, silk thread typically was wrapped with thin strips of gilded paper; these gilded threads were flat, taking the form of the paper, but could not be integrated fully with the non-gold silk threads of brocades. The flat Chinese gold threads differed from the non-flat, thus flexible, golden silk threads developed by the Persians and artisans in the Transoxiana region. Called nasij (also known as nashiri 納失失/ 納石失, a lampas woven with gold threads). Nasij had a continuous pattern in gold, often popularly called cloth-of-gold, or plain fabric with a motif in gold. By the Yuan dynasty, Mongols' jisün robes were often woven with gold thread (nasij).

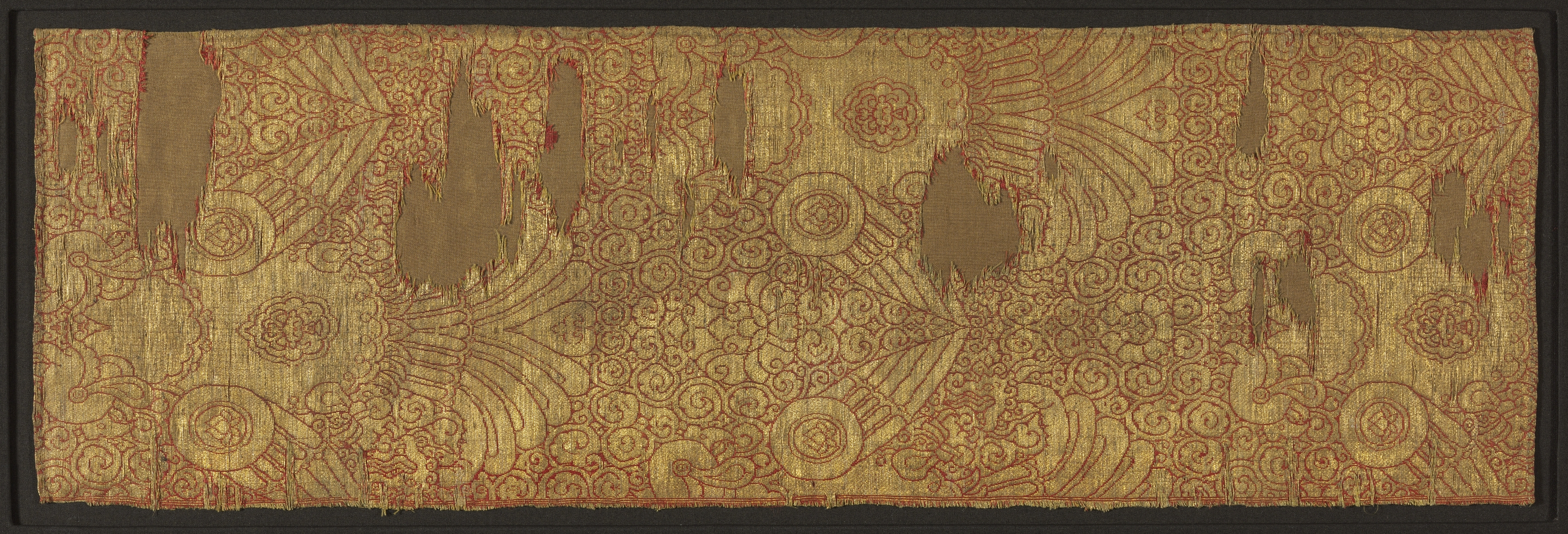
Lampas, silk and gold thread; textile used in the making of jisün, 1240.

== Usage ==
- Hanfu and Qizhuang: Dragon robe, python robe, Feiyufu, Mamianqun
- Jisün

== Influences and derivatives ==
=== Middle East and Europe ===
According to British records dating to the late 19th century, gold foil was the ordinary form of precious metal which was used in embroidery; according to the records, gold foil was a Chinese invention wherein Chinese people invented the process of laying a thin gold leaf on paper before rolling it around a silk thread. Due to the close trading relation between China and the Arabs, the Arabs learned the Chinese gold thread process who then regularly employing in their textile from the 10th to 14th century; Chinese gold thread technology were also adopted by Italian weavers according to British records dating in 1886.

=== Southeast Asia ===
Gold leaf glue-work patterns used in ceremonial costumes of the courts and principalities were imported from China throughout the 19th and early 20th century. Chinese communities in Southeast Asian countries used gold leaf to embellish their batik wedding skirts.

== Similar items ==
- Geumbak – a Korean traditional craft for applying extremely thin gold leaf.
- Surihaku – a Japanese embroidery technique, which uses metal (gold or silver) leaf applied to a foundation fabric.

== See also ==
- Chinese auspicious ornaments in textile and clothing
- History of silk
- Silk industry in China
