= Embroidered Uniform Guard =

Imperial secret police of the Ming dynasty

- 錦衣衞
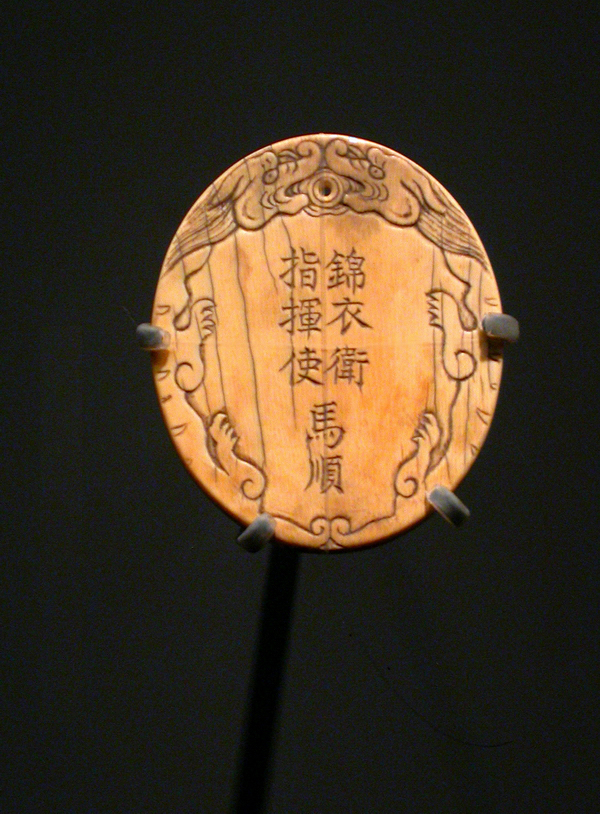
- A Jinyiwei guard's tablet which says: Jinyiwei commander Ma Shun.

Secret Police overview
- Formed: 1368–1644
- Type: Secret police Intelligence agency
- Jurisdiction: Ming Dynasty China
- Headquarters: Forbidden City "Eastern Bureau"
- Employees: 14,000 (peak strength)

The Embroidered Uniform Guard (traditional Chinese: 錦衣衞; simplified Chinese: 锦衣卫; pinyin: Jǐnyīwèi; lit. 'brocade-clothing guard') was the imperial secret police that served the emperors of the Ming dynasty in China. The guard was founded by the Hongwu Emperor, founding emperor of Ming, in 1368 to serve as his personal bodyguards. In 1369, it became an imperial military body. They were given the authority to overrule judicial proceedings in prosecutions with full autonomy in arresting, interrogating and punishing anyone, including nobles and the emperor's relatives.

The Embroidered Uniform Guard was tasked with collecting military intelligence on the enemy and participation in reconnaissance. The guards donned a distinctive golden-yellow uniform, with a tablet worn on the torso, and carried a sword (Dao) known as the embroidered spring knife (繡春刀; Xiù chūn dāo).

== History ==
The Jinyiwei originated as early as 1360. They served as Zhu Yuanzhang's personal bodyguards and defended him during a battle with the warlord Chen Youliang. After Zhu founded the Ming dynasty and became the Hongwu Emperor, he doubted his subjects' loyalties towards him and was constantly on guard against possible rebellions and assassinations. One of the early duties of the Jinyiwei was to help the emperor spy on his subjects. The Hongwu Emperor increased the Jinyiwei's duties later, allowing them to inspect his officials at work in the capital city, before formally establishing it in 1382 with about 500 members. Their numbers subsequently increased to around 14,000 in just three years.

In 1393, the Hongwu Emperor reduced the Jinyiwei's duties after they allegedly abused their authority during the investigation of a rebellion plot by general Lan Yu, in which about 40,000 people were implicated and executed. When the Yongle Emperor ascended to the throne, he was afraid that his subjects might be discontented with him, because he came to power by usurping his nephew's throne (see Jingnan campaign). He reinstated the Jinyiwei's authority to increase his control over the imperial court. The Jinyiwei was disbanded after 262 years of existence when Li Zicheng's rebel forces overthrew the Ming dynasty in 1644.

== Service ==
The Embroidered Guard were authorized to overrule judicial proceedings in prosecuting those deemed as enemies of the state, granted with full autonomy in arresting, interrogating, detaining them without trial and punishing them, without going through due process. They were bound to the service of the emperor and took direct orders from him. They also served as political commissars for the Ming armies in times of war. In the later years of the Ming dynasty, the Jinyiwei were placed under the control of the Eastern Depot faction. As the government sank into corruption, the Jinyiwei was constantly used as a means of eliminating political opponents through assassinations and legal prosecutions.

== Headquarters ==
The headquarters of the Jinyiwei was to the west of Tian'anmen Square where the Great Hall of the People is located at present.

== Clothing and attire ==
Guards wore the following:

- Mangfu (python robe)
- Feiyufu (flying fish clothing)
- Jisün

== Famed Guards ==
- Mao Xiang (毛驤)
- Jiang Huan (蔣𤩽)
- Ji Gang (紀綱)
- Xia Yu (夏煜)
- Sai Hazhi (賽哈智)
- Xu Gong (徐恭)
- Ma Shun (馬順)
- Lu Zhong (盧忠)
- Zhu Ji (朱骥): Yu Qian's son-in-law
- Lu Gao (逯杲)
- Men Da (門達)
- Yuan Bin (袁彬)
- Ha Ming (哈銘)
- Wan Tong (萬通)
- Zhu Ji (朱驥)
- Mou Bin (牟斌)
- Shi Wenyi (石文義)
- Qian Ning (錢寧)
- Jiang Bin (江彬)
- Zhu Chen (朱宸)
- Luo An (駱安)
- Wang Zuo (王佐)
- Lu Bing (陸炳)
- Zhu Xizhong (朱希忠)
- Tian Ergeng (田爾耕)

=== Southern Ming ===
- Zou Zhiyou (鄒之有)
- Wu Mengming (吳孟明)

== Gallery ==
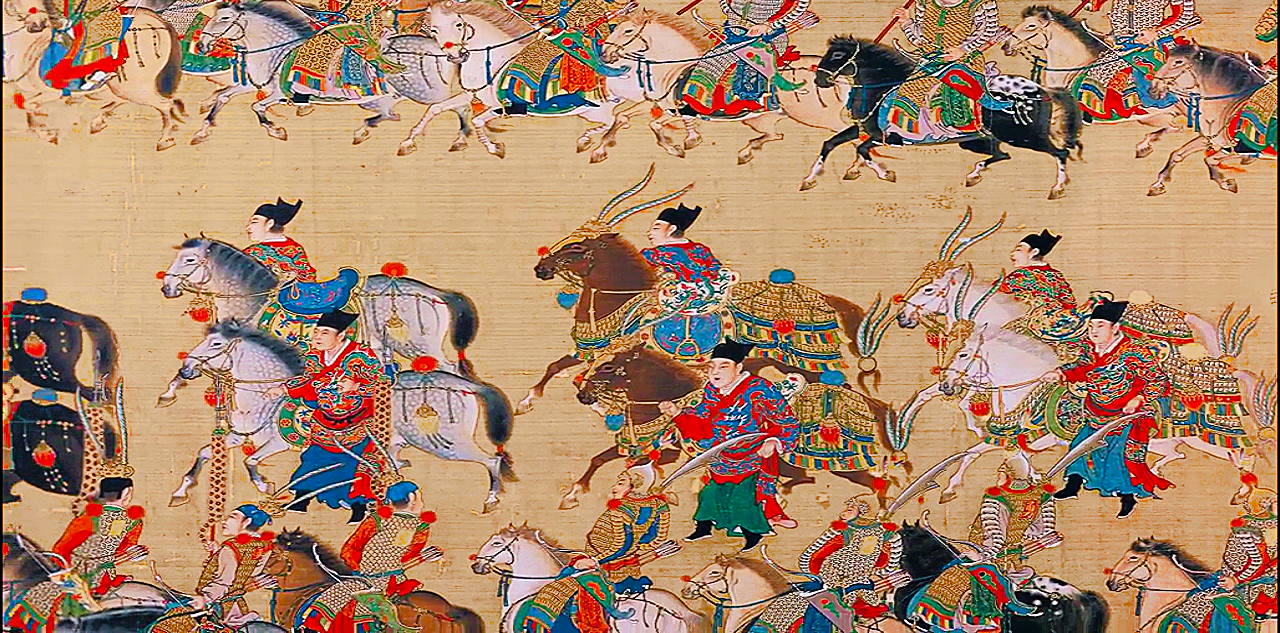
High ranking Jinyiwei escorting the Emperor's prized horses during imperial parade.

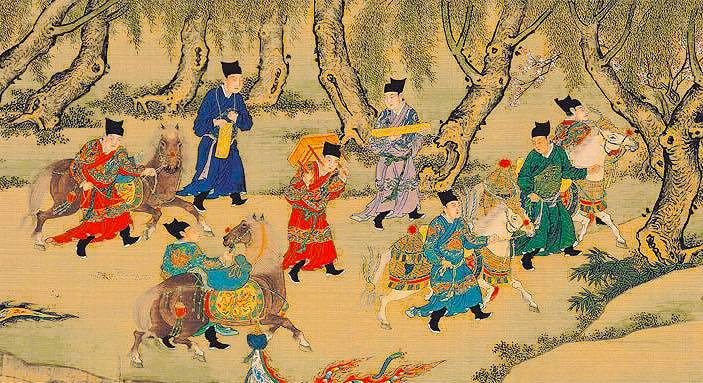
Several Jinyiwei guarding the Emperor's treasures.

== In popular culture ==
- The 1985 Hong Kong Shaw Brothers film Secret Service of the Imperial Court, Chinese title Jinyiwei, starred Bryan Leung as a Jinyiwei commander.
- The 2010 television series Yi Zhi Mei, produced by Chinese Entertainment Shanghai, features the Jinyiwei as devoted to the corrupt Prime Minister.
- The 2010 film 14 Blades featured the Jinyiwei, starring Donnie Yen as a Jinyiwei captain.
- The 2011 Hong Kong television series Relic of an Emissary produced by TVB starred Michael Tse as a Jinyiwei captain and later as general.
- The 2014 film Brotherhood of Blades directed by Lu Yang depicts a group of Jingyiwei embroiled in a political power struggle and intrigue in the dying days of the Ming Dynasty. A sequel was subsequently released: Brotherhood of Blades II: The Infernal Battlefield in 2017.
- The wuxia manhua Blood and Steel features the Jinyiwei as one of the multiple factions striving for power in the martial arts world.
- The webcomic Drive by Dave Kellett features a futuristic secret police organization named the Jinyiwei.
- The webcomic My Boyfriend is a Jinyiwei by Hong Yi features a time traveling, tsundere Jinyiwei character who ended up in the present.
- The Ubisoft video game For Honor features the playable character "Zhanhu", based on the Jinyiwei.
- The drama Under the Power (Chinese: Jin Yi Zhi Xia), directed by Yi Tao, features the character Lu Yi, who is a Jinyiwei.
- The drama The Sleuth of the Ming Dynasty, produced by Jackie Chan, prominently features characters that are in the Jinyiwei.
