= Yesa robe =

Ming dynasty robe derived from a Mongol robe

- Chinese: 曳撒袍
Transcriptions
Standard Mandarin
- Hanyu Pinyin: Yèsāpáo

Alternative Chinese name
- Chinese: 一撒
Transcriptions
Standard Mandarin
- Hanyu Pinyin: Yī sā

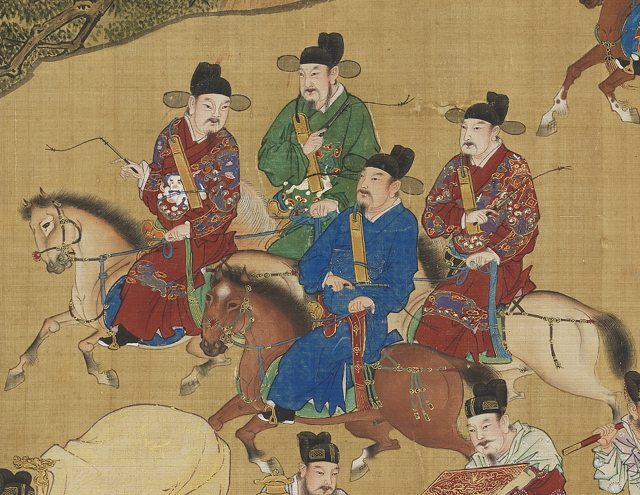
Ming dynasty officials wearing yesa robes.

Yesa robe (Chinese: 曳撒袍; pinyin: Yèsāpáo), also known simply referred as Yesa (Chinese: 曳撒), Yisan (Chinese: 曳撒), or Yisa (Chinese: 一撒), is an ancient type of Chinese clothing worn during the Ming dynasty. It originated in the Ming dynasty but was influenced from clothing of the Yuan dynasty. It is sometimes described as being a sinicized version of the Mongol's jisün and could only be found in China. Yesa was a regular clothing in the Ming dynasty; it was initially worn in the palace and by the wealthy, and it later spread to the commoners.

== Construction and design ==
The yesa robe is a cross-collared, long sleeved robe with narrow pleats on the lower hem; while the back of the lower part is flat, the front had two densely pleated sides with a flat middle, similar to the mamianqun. It has two hems at each sides. Compared to the Mongol Yuan's terlig, the sleeves and the bodice were wider; the pleats were also wide compared to very finely gathered skirt of the Mongols' terlig. The yesa also had no waistband, and the skirt was also longer.

The absence of the threaded/braided waistband, the absence of pleats at the centre back and front of the skirt, and the presence of large side pleats were the main features of the yesa; these features were developed in the Ming dynasty and were not of Mongol origins. These features also differentiated it from its precursor.

The yesa also showed sedentary lifestyle and Chinese cultural characteristics: its increase in length made it lose its functionality for horse-riding purposes; the flat centre back's appearance as well-arranged pleats were too hard to maintain when sitting. Moreover, the folds which were originally found at the centre front of the terlig also had to disappear as it interrupted the dignity of the vertical line, a feature which was important in Chinese clothing culture.

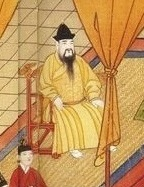
Front view of a yesa: flat centre front with side pleats, Ming dynasty

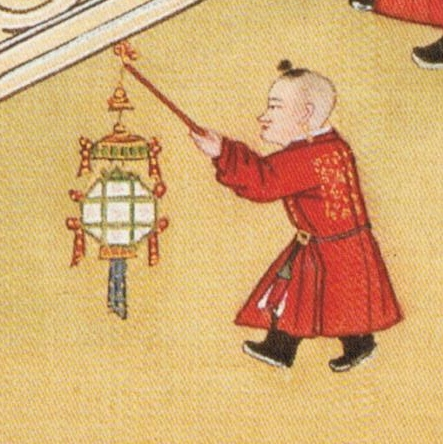
Back view of a yesa: flat centre back and side peats, Ming dynasty

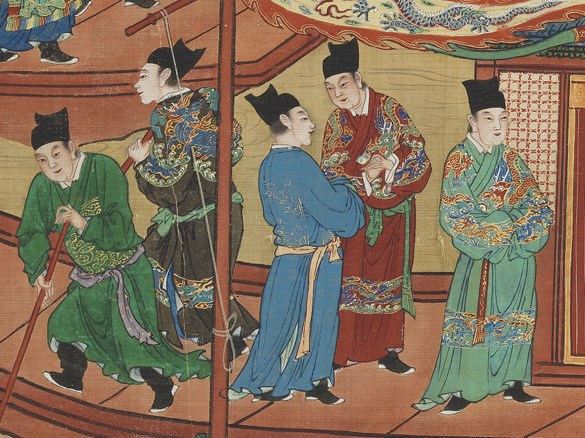
Yesa in various colors and patterns depending on station.

== History ==
=== Origins ===
During the Ming dynasty, some clothing incorporated the clothing elements from the Han Chinese and the Mongol clothing tradition; one of those mixed-elements is the yesa. The clothing known as yesa originated in the Ming dynasty, but some of its elements were either adopted from the Yuan dynasty Mongol's terlig, or directly from the Mongol's jisün clothing, which is also a form of terlig. The yesa is itself a new evolution of terlig.

=== Ming dynasty ===
The yesa robe is a form of kuzhe (Chinese: 袴褶; clothing with trousers for riding or military style clothing); however, the design of the yesa made it no more functional for horse riding.

The yesa was worn as an informal attire by emperors, princes, ministers, and officials in their spare time during the early period of the Ming dynasty; it was worn as a formal uniforms in some occasions during the middle period of the Ming dynasty; it was worn as a casual dress worn by scholar-officials during the mid-to-late period of the Ming dynasty; and eventually it was worn by servants and commoners in the late Ming.

The Ming court eunuchs wore yesa robe in different styles, such as the red-coloured yesa robes with a qilin patch, round-collared yesa robes, and light green yesa robe, etc.

== Gallery ==
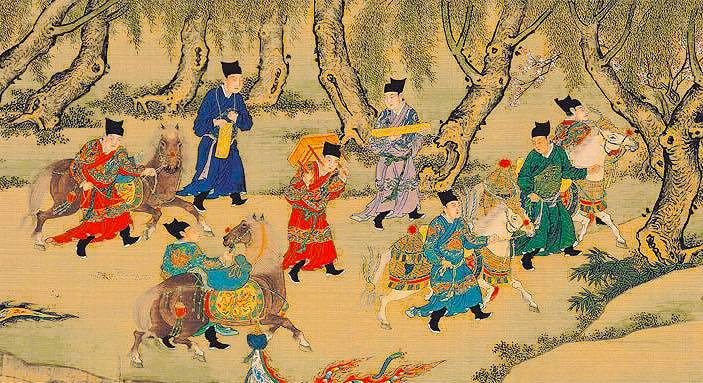
Jinyiwei Ming Dynasty.

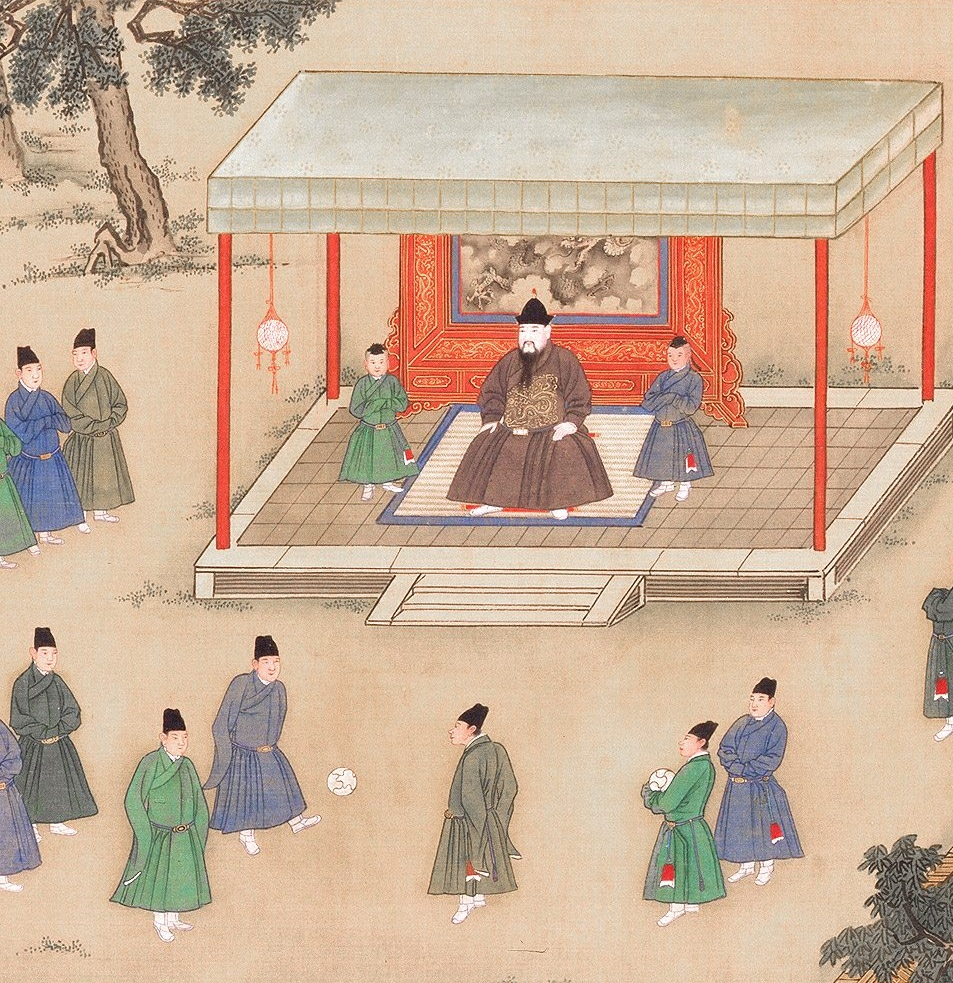

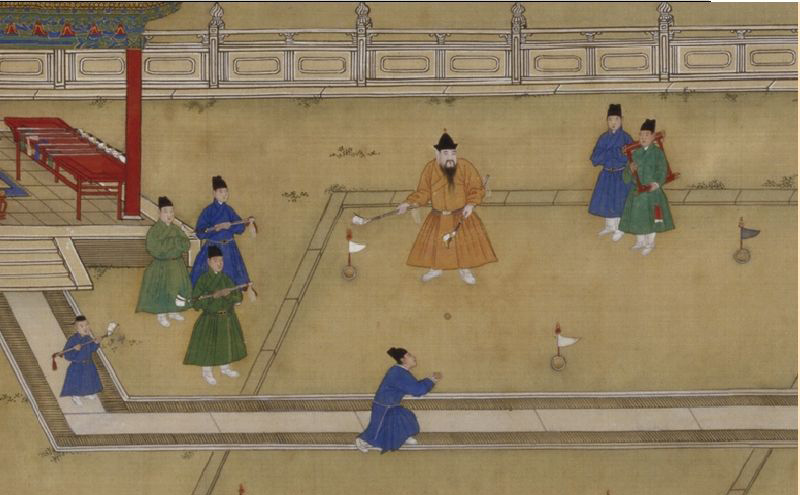

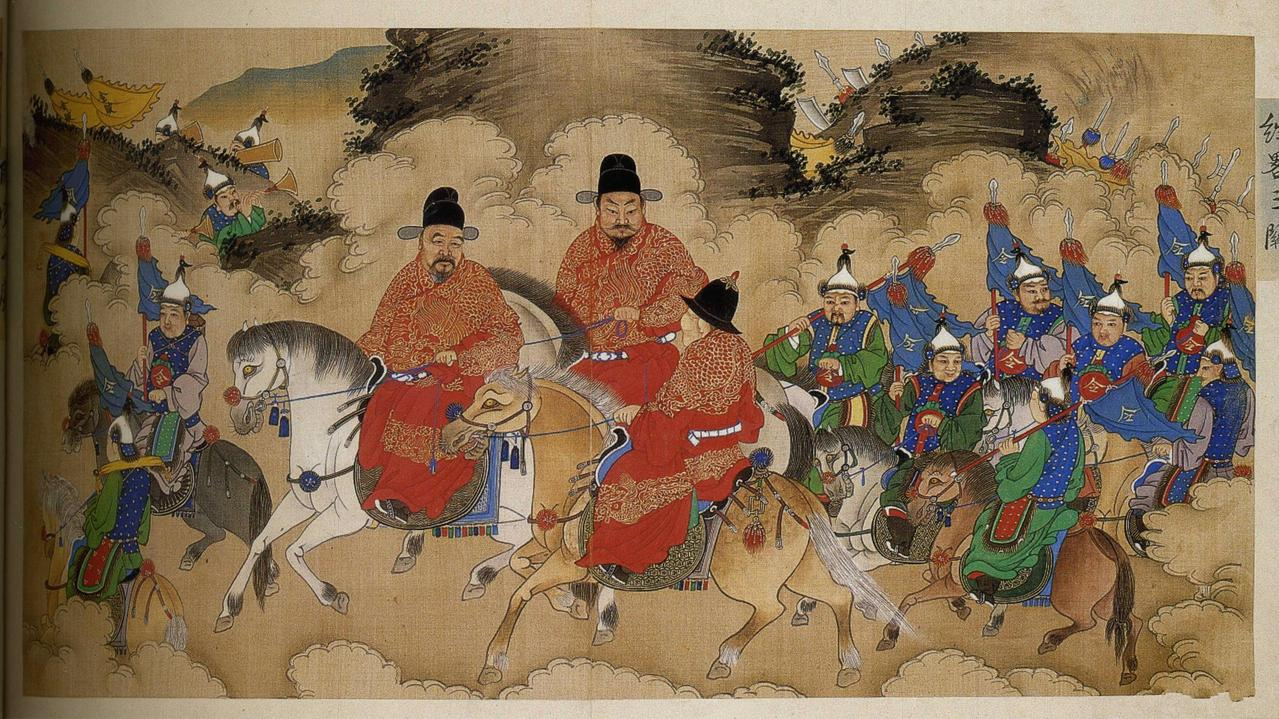

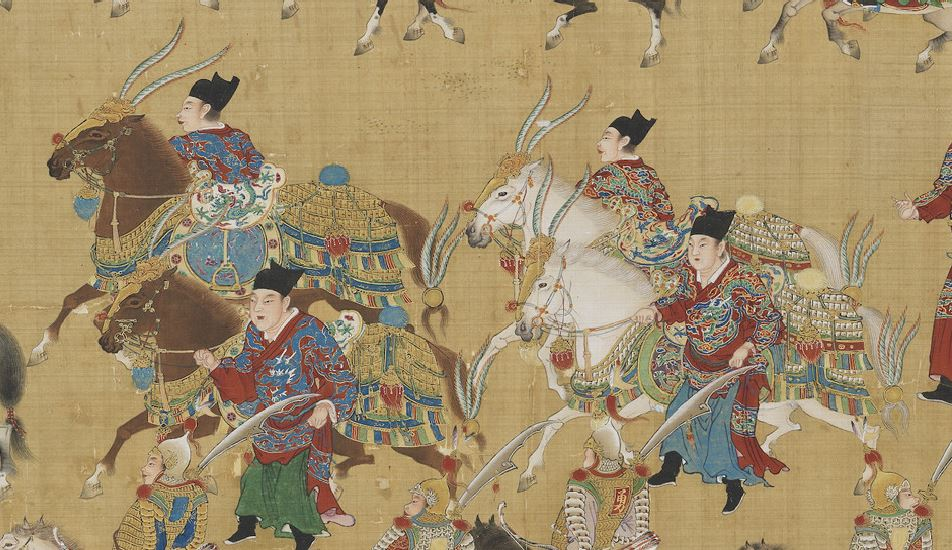

== Similar items ==
- Jisün
- Terlig
- Feiyufu

== See also ==
- Hanfu
- List of Hanfu
- Fashion in Yuan dynasty
