= Terlig =

Type of robe of Mongol origin

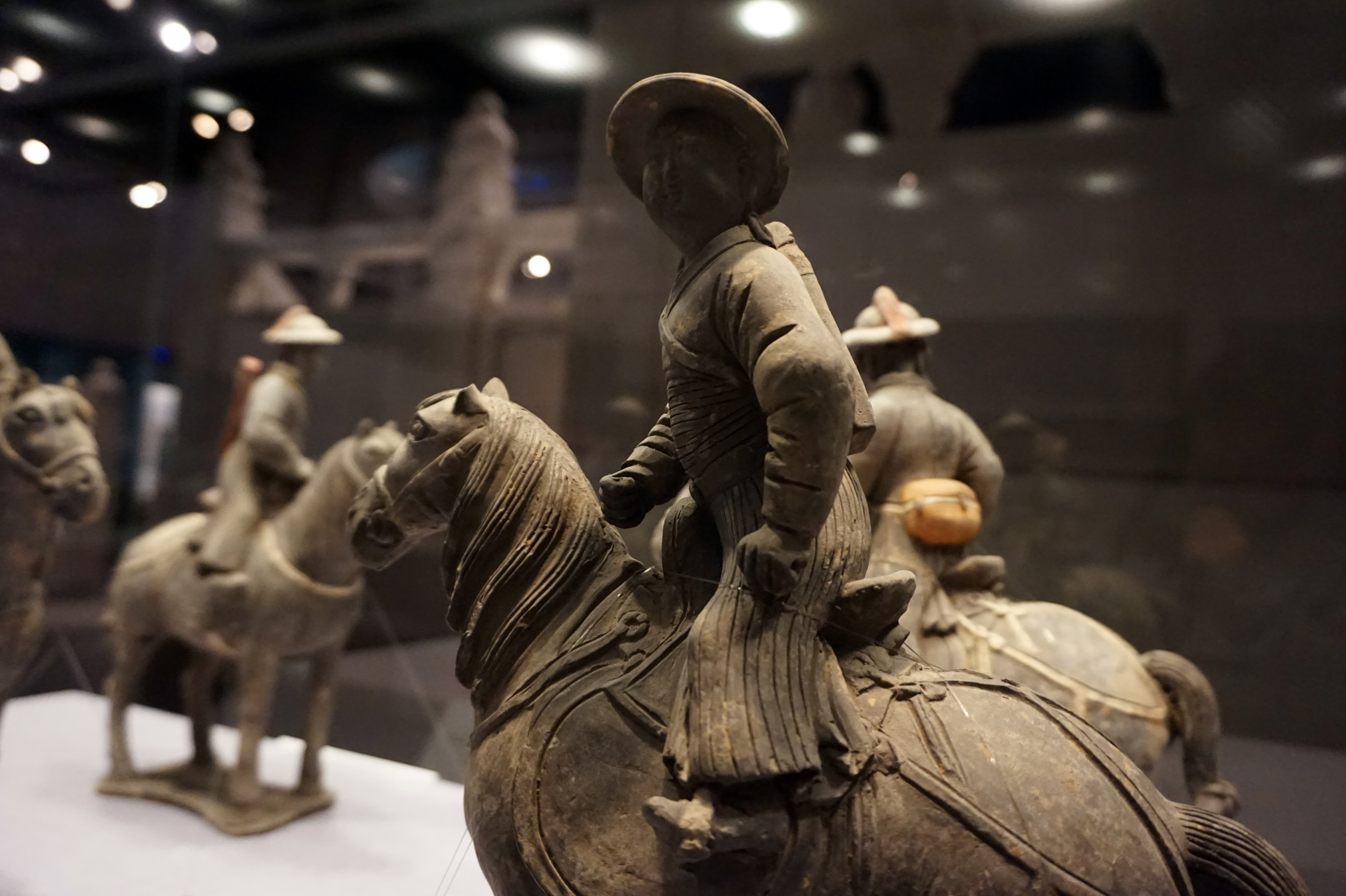
- Riding male figure wearing the Mongol Yuan Terlig, also known as bianxiaoao (辫线袄).

Chinese name
- Traditional Chinese: 貼裏
- Simplified Chinese: 帖裡
Transcriptions
Standard Mandarin
- Hanyu Pinyin: tiēlǐ
Yue: Cantonese
- Yale Romanization: tip léih
- Jyutping: tip³ lei⁵

Korean name
- Hangul: 철릭
- Hanja: 貼裏/帖裏
Transcriptions
- Revised Romanization: cheollik
- McCune–Reischauer: ch'ŏllik

Terlig, also known as tieli (simplified Chinese: 帖裡; traditional Chinese: 貼裏; pinyin: tiēlǐ), bianxianao (辫线袄; 辮線襖; biànxiànǎo; 'coat with plaited line') or Yaoxianao[zi] (腰线袄[子]; 腰線襖[子]; yāoxiànǎo[zi]; 'coat with waist line') in Chinese, or commonly referred as Mongol dress or plait-line robe, is an archetypal type of Mongol clothing for men.

The terlig was initially developed to accommodate the equestrian and nomadic lifestyle of the Mongols, and to protect their bodies from the cold temperature of steppe regions. It was sometimes decorated with cloud collar (雲肩; yunjian; 'cloud-shoulder') pattern which decorated around the robe's collar, chest, and shoulders area. As the terlig gained symbolic meaning with time and as it spread into different regions, its shape and design evolved. Hybrid forms of the terlig was developed as it came in contact with other local cultures. The terlig was worn in China, Central Asia, Korea, the Mughal Empire in India, and in medieval Egypt, Turkey, Persia, and other parts of West Asia. It is still worn as Mongol ethnic clothing in some regions.

== Terminology ==
The origins of the term terlig are debatable. It may have come from the Turkic word tärlik.

== History ==
=== Mongolia ===
==== Origins ====
The terlig is of Mongol origins. According to a paper published in 2003, no terlig were found in Han Chinese nationalities and in other nationalities in Northern China prior to the establishment of the Yuan dynasty. Originally, the Mongol terlig was a type of long, knee-length coat with a front-opening coat with voluminous folds along the waistline and side vents at the side to provide ease of movement; it also has long and tight sleeves, tight-fitting bodice, a wide waistband and the coat is fastened at the side. It was made with animal hides.

==== Mongolian ethnic clothing ====
In modern times, the term terlig is still used to describe Mongolian ethnic clothing. The Buryats wear a coat called tyrlyk which can refer to a coat which can come with or without folds at the waist.

=== China ===
==== Yuan dynasty (1271-1368 AD) ====
Illustration of the yaoxianao[zi] from the Chinese encyclopedia Gujin Tushu Jicheng, between 1700 and 1725 AD

In the Yuan dynasty, the terlig was known as yaoxianao[zi] (腰线袄[子]; 腰線襖子) or bianxianao (辫线袄; 辮線襖) in Chinese literature; it was a popular style of coat and was a very important form of clothing. The terlig became more established and symbolized the attire of people of higher social status. It was worn by people of all social classes; status markers became the fabric quality. The jisün clothing was itself a variation of the terlig.

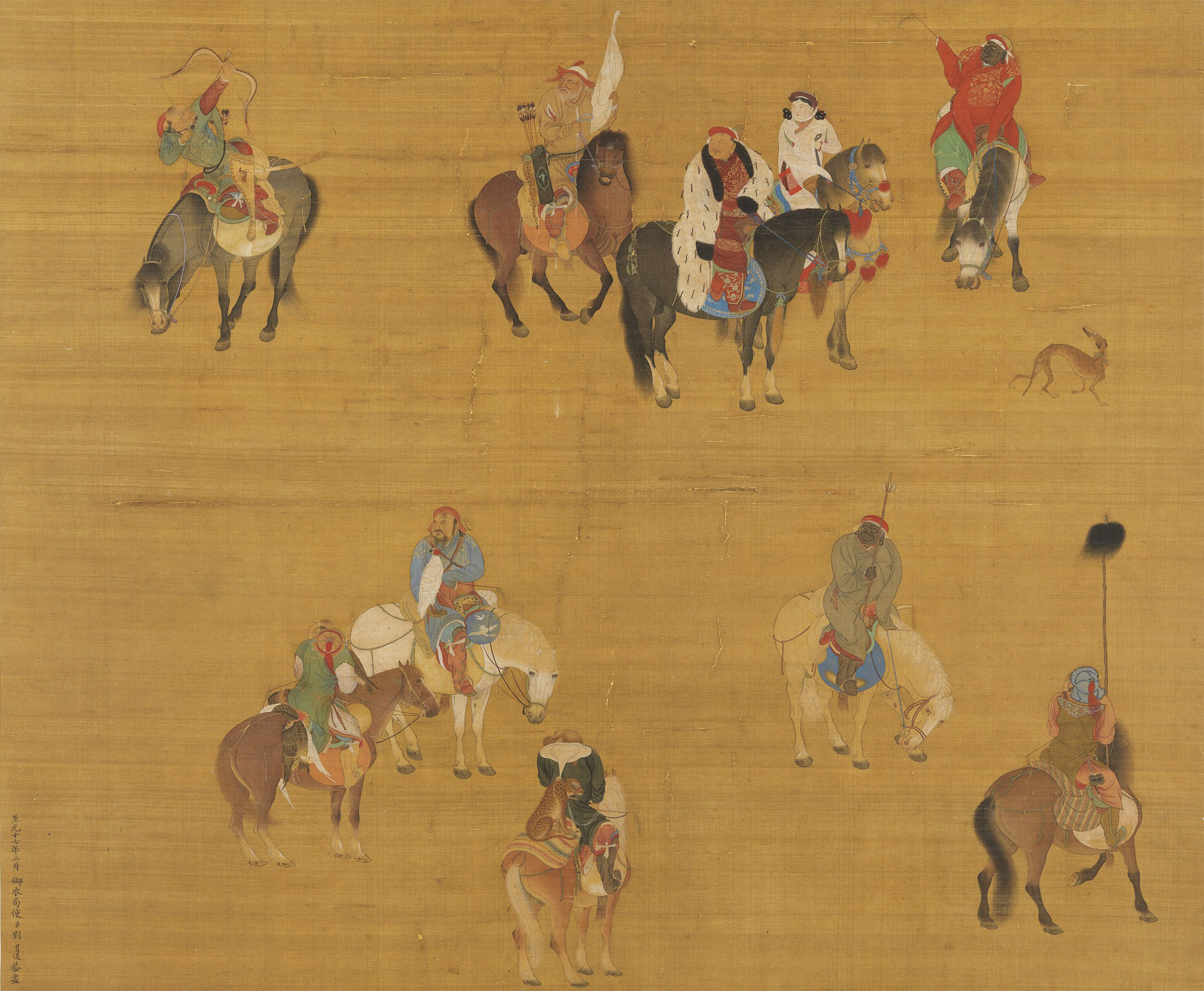
The Emperor and the guards wearing the Mongol terlig, from the painting Hunting scene of Kublai Khan.

The terlig in the Yuan dynasty was especially characterized by the presence of numerous narrow and dense folds (or pleats) at waist and by the presence of "waist-thread" decoration on the waistband wherein people would use red and silk threads to fasten the coat on their waist. These two features were the biggest advantages of the coat which made it suitable for riding horses. The waistband was large and typically 15 cm in width. The robe was also calf-length, had long narrow sleeves, and had a cinched waist which was created by the waist-thread; it also had a side closure which was fastened at the right side with ties. The collar could either be cross-collared or round-collared. It could be decorated with flowers and could come in various colours. From the early to later periods of the Yuan dynasty, the basic form of terlig remained relatively unchanged, although some variations of the ribbon (i.e. ribboned vs braided waist) most likely coexisted together.

==== Ming dynasty (1368–1644 AD) ====
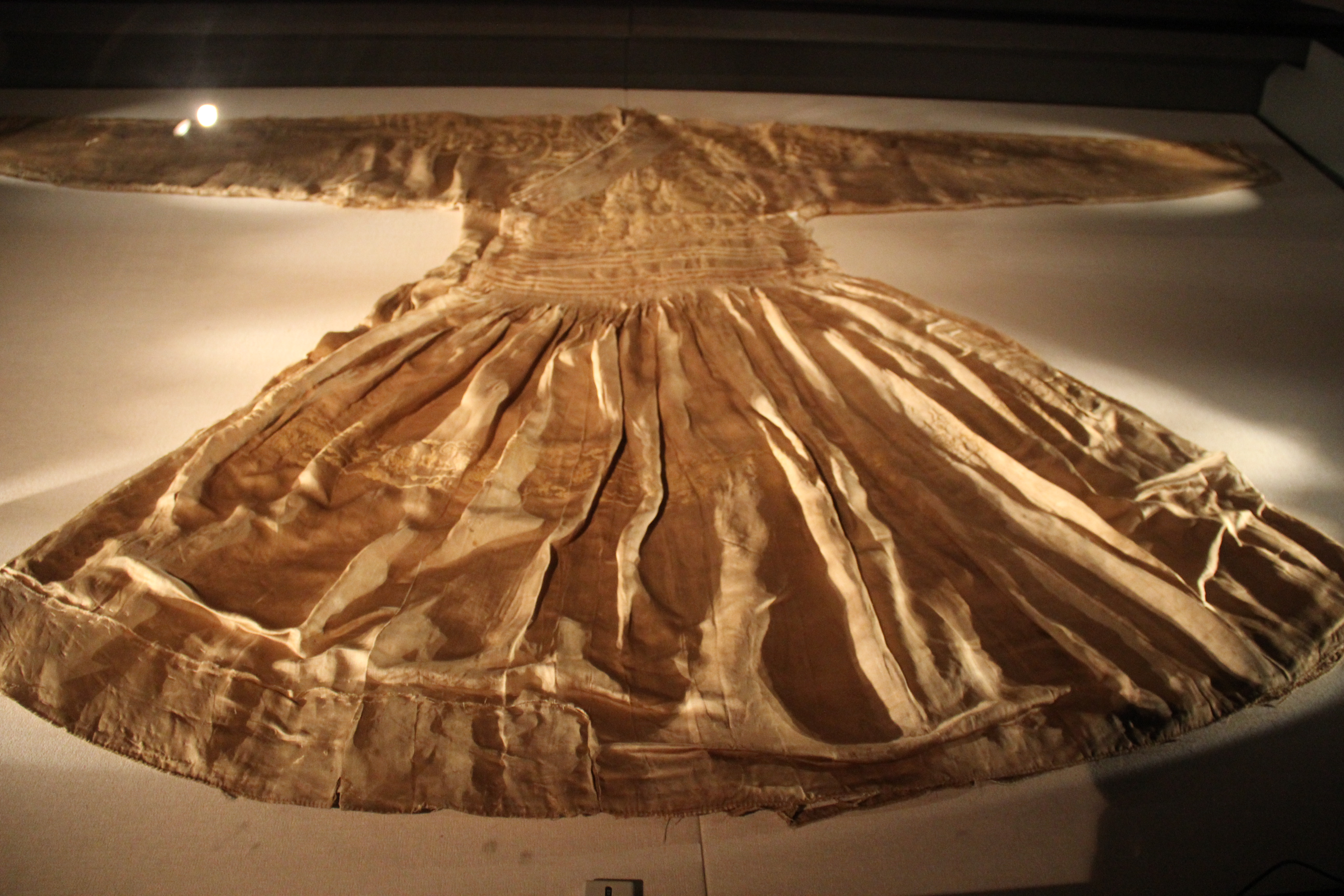
Tieli with waistband features, Tomb of Ming dynasty Prince Zhu Tan.

Some Mongol clothing from the Yuan dynasty was continued in the Ming dynasty despite the repeated prohibition of Mongol-style clothing, especially during the reign of the Hongwu Emperor. The jisün, a type of Yuan dynasty terlig, continued to be worn in Ming dynasty, where it was known as zhisun robe.

The Daminghuidian (大明会典) records the yaoxianao[zi] (terlig/tieli) was worn by the official in charge of imperial protocol during the Keqi period; "During Keqi, they wear head-wraps and colourful waist-thread coats decorated with eagles and sparrow-hawks at front and back". In the Ming dynasty tomb of Prince Zhu Tan (1370 – 1389 AD), a tieli with tight sleeves and has the waistband characteristics was excavated; this robe was almost similar to the terlig found in the Yuan dynasty.

After being adopted in the Ming dynasty, the tieli eventually became longer, and its overall structure was made closer to the shenyi system in order to integrate Han Chinese rituals; it also lost its "waist-thread" characteristics in the process. Localized forms of Mongol terlig continued to be called tieli (貼裏). The tieli continued to be worn in the Ming dynasty by high-ranking eunuchs. The tieli could also be decorated with ornate patterns, such as the feiyufu (飞鱼服; 飛魚服; 'flying fish clothing').

Another new style of Ming dynasty tieli was the pleated robe (褶(摺)子衣; Zhě(zhé)ziyī), which was also derived from and heavily influenced by the Yuan dynasty's yaoxianao[zi]. The lower hem of the zhezhiyi had numerous dense and narrow pleats (with little space between each pleats) and kept more features akin to the Mongol terlig than the yesa robe. It also lacked the "waist-thread" characteristics of the Yuan dynasty's yaoxianao[zi].

The yesa robe, a new Ming dynasty style of clothing, has some of its mixed-elements either developed from the Yuan dynasty Mongol terlig or from jisün clothing, which is itself a type of terlig. One of the main characteristics of the yesa was the absence of waistband and the absence of fold on the central front and back of the robe. It was also longer than the Yuan dynasty's terlig.

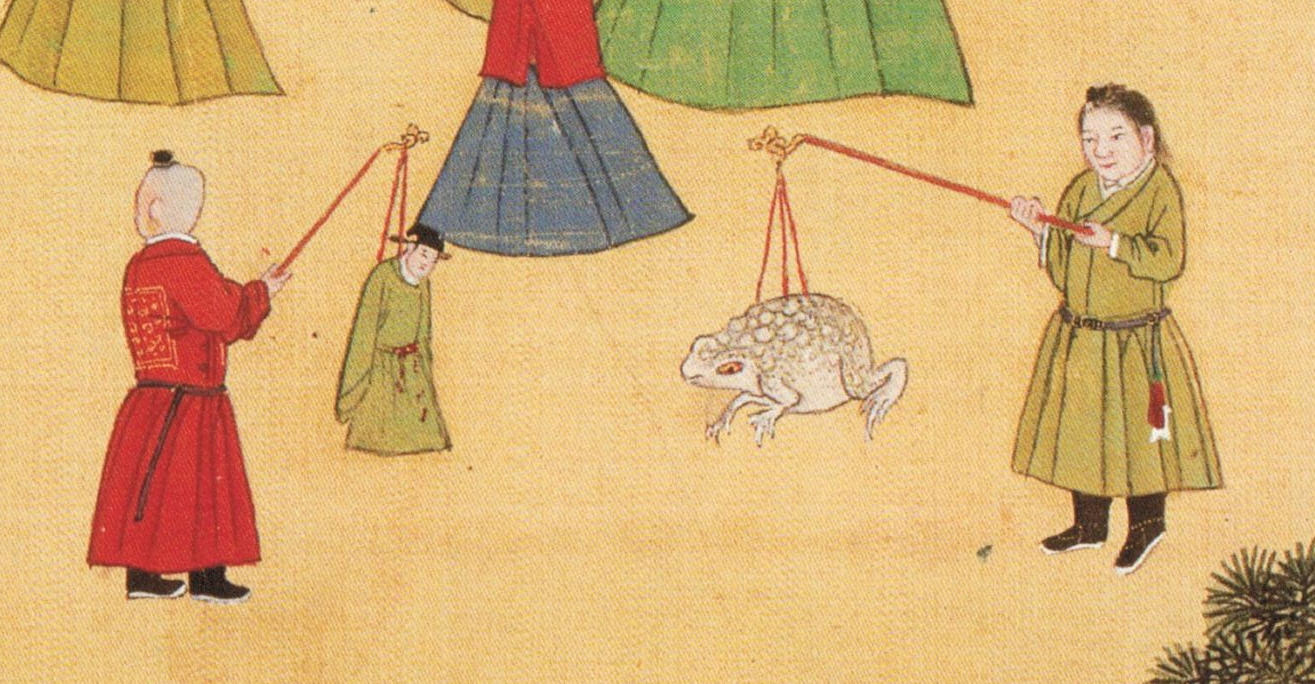
Ming dynasty Tieli (i.e. terlig).

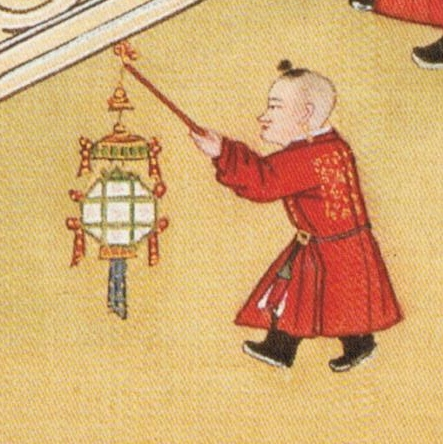
Ming dynasty Yesa, a derivative of the Yuan dynasty Mongol's terlig.

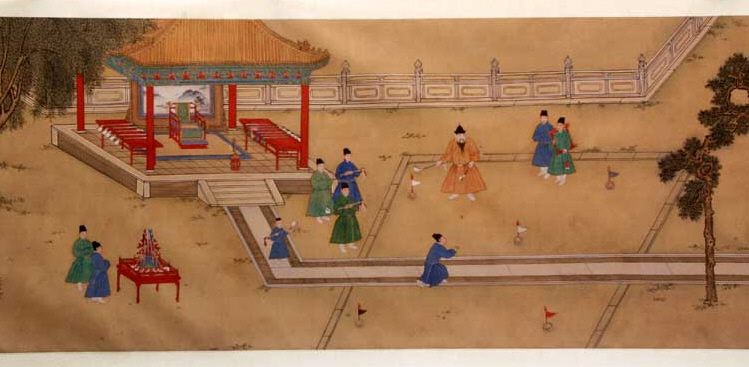
Ming Emperor and his servants wearing yesa, a derivative of the Mongol terlig, c. 15th century AD.

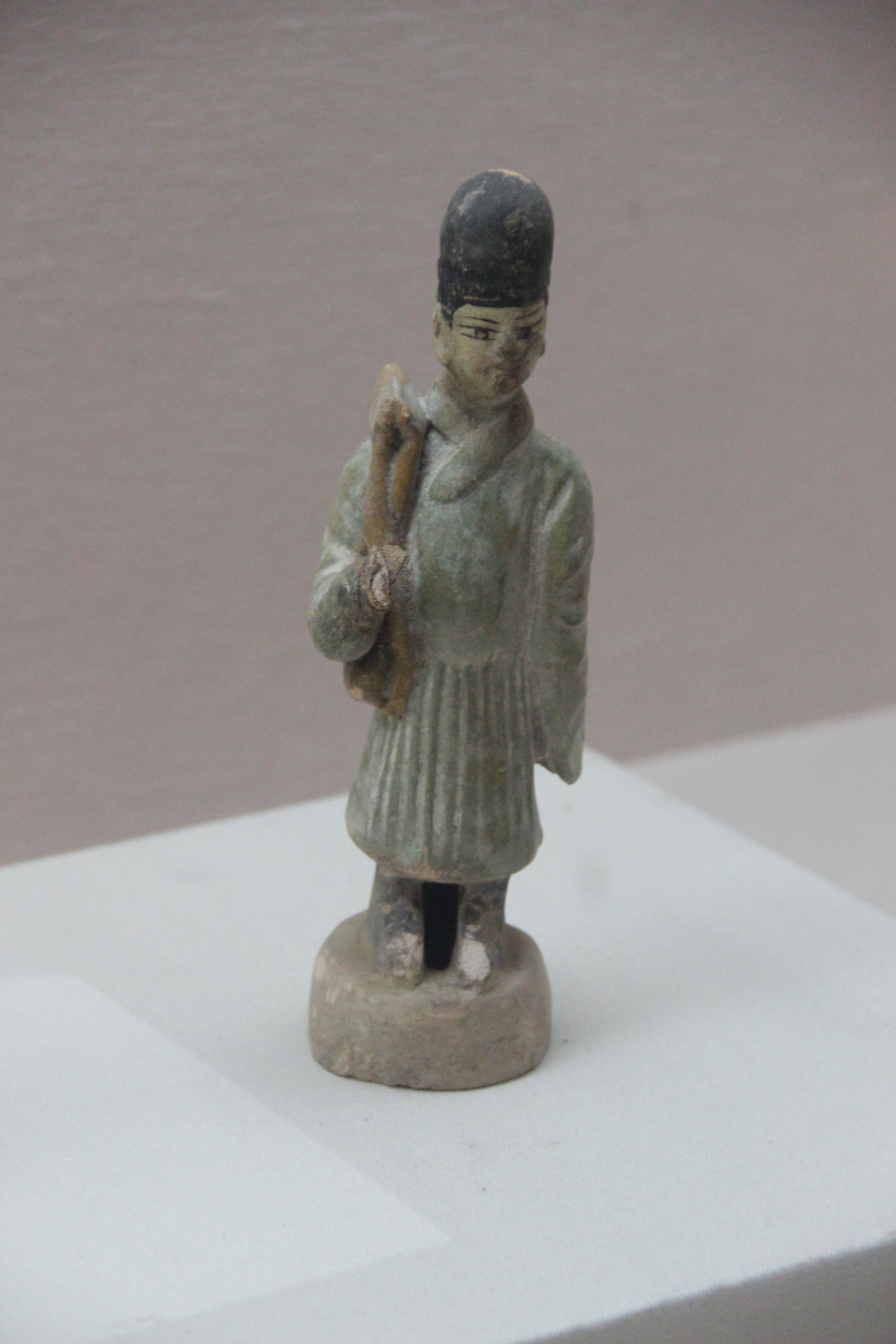
Pottery figure wearing a tieli, Ming dynasty

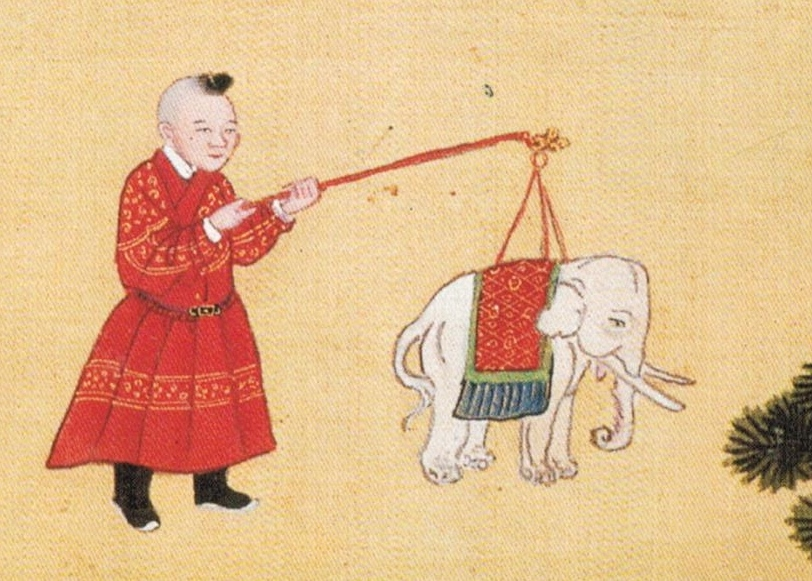
Ming dynasty tieli

==== Qing dynasty (1644–1912 AD) ====
In the Qing dynasty, the terlig evolved into a form of ceremonial dress (Chinese: 朝服; pinyin: chaofu), a robe with folds at the waist. The Qing dynasty chaofu was also a Manchu adaptation of the Han Chinese court dress. The Manchu element can be seen from the slim-fitting sleeves and horse-hoof-shaped cuffs, which are the vestiges of the Manchu clothing worn when people were hunting in cold weather.

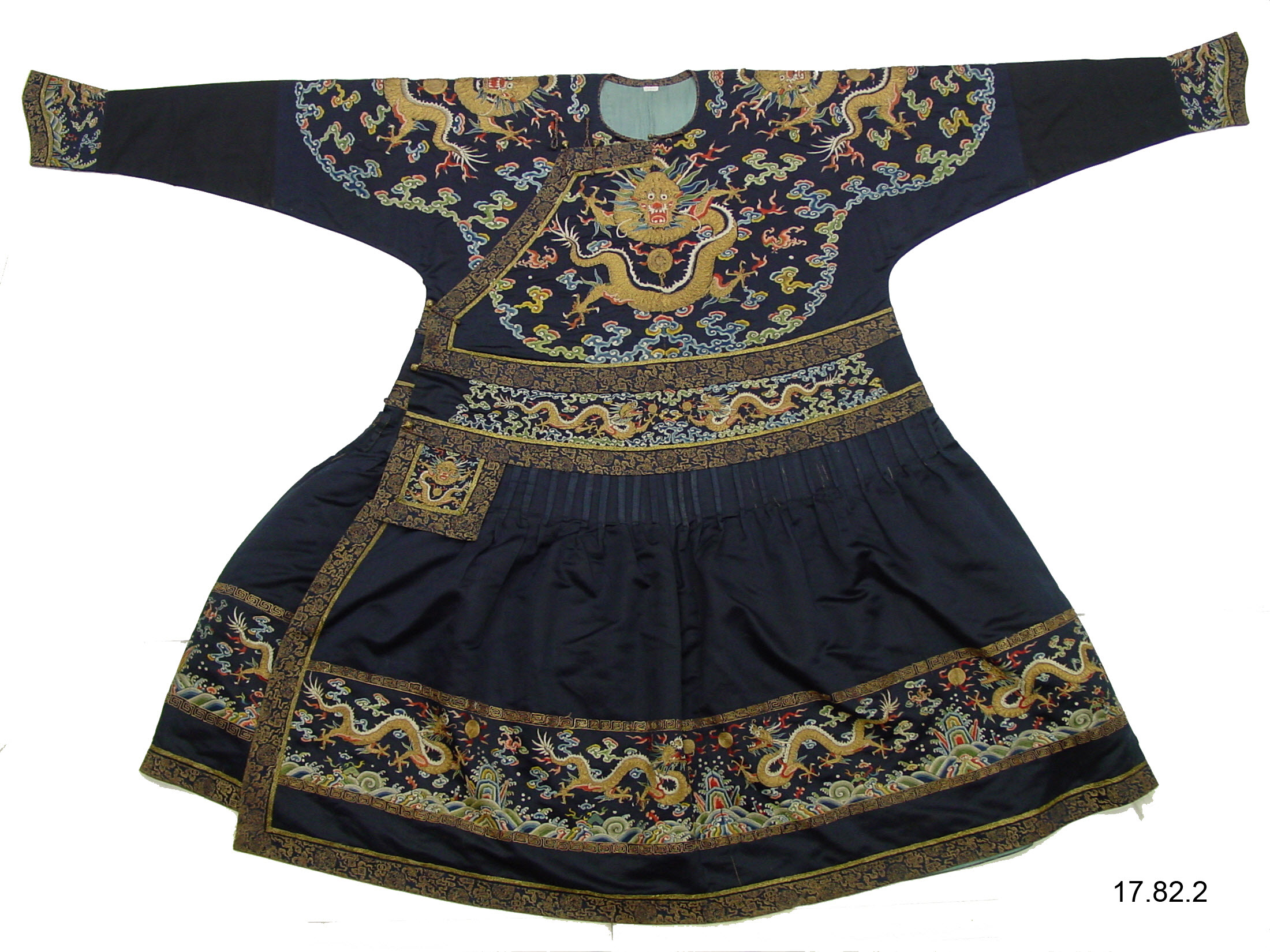
Qing dynasty chaofu.

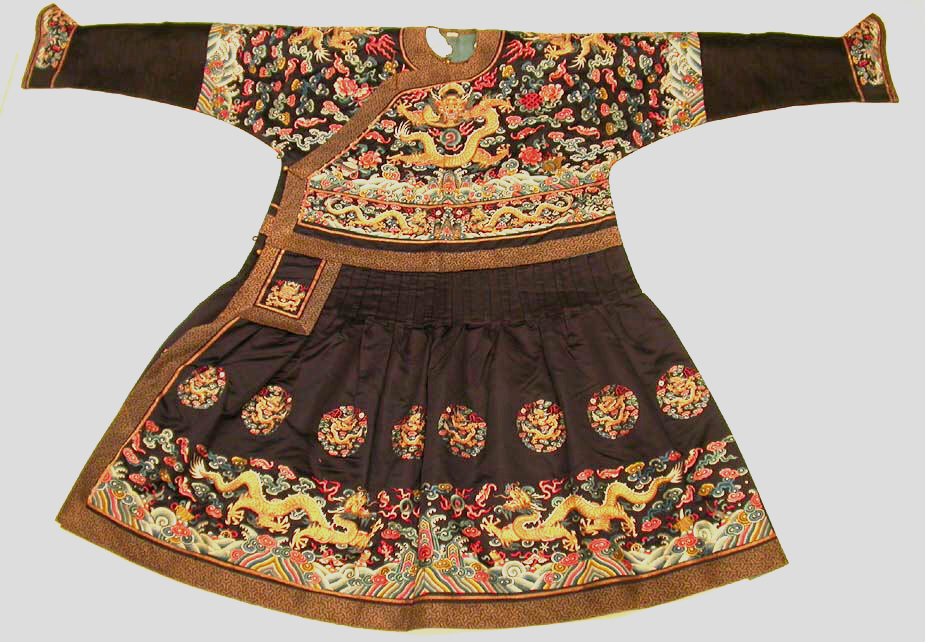
Qing dynasty chaofu, second half of the 19th century. It features a fully pleated skirt.

=== Korea ===
The earliest records of the term terlig in Korea date from the 15th century AD. The term terlig can be written in several ways in Korea, such as t'yŏllik (텰릭 or 텬릭), ch'ŏllik (철릭), or ch'ŏnik (천익), or ch'ŏmni (帖裡, 帖裏, 貼裏) or ch'ŏnik (天益, 天翼, 千翼). The term cheolick (철릭) is derived from the Mongolian term terlig; the term was introduced in Korea through China along with Chinese characters but continued to maintain the Mongolian sound.

==== Goryeo (918–1392 AD) ====
The terlig was introduced in Korea from the Yuan dynasty during the later period of the mid-Goryeo dynasty as daily clothing or as yangbok (i.e. military clothing). In the Goryeosa, Mongol clothing were typically referred as hobok (胡服; 'barbaric outlander's clothing') and sometimes as ilsaek (一色; 'clothing of one-colour') for jilson (質孫 or 只孫) banquets. The terlig became more and more common in Korea due to the close relationship between the Goryeo and Mongol court through political marriages, and Mongol clothing was adopted in the Korean court in the late 13th and early 14th centuries AD. Some artefacts of Goryeo-period terligs have survived time.

==== Joseon (1392–1897 AD) ====
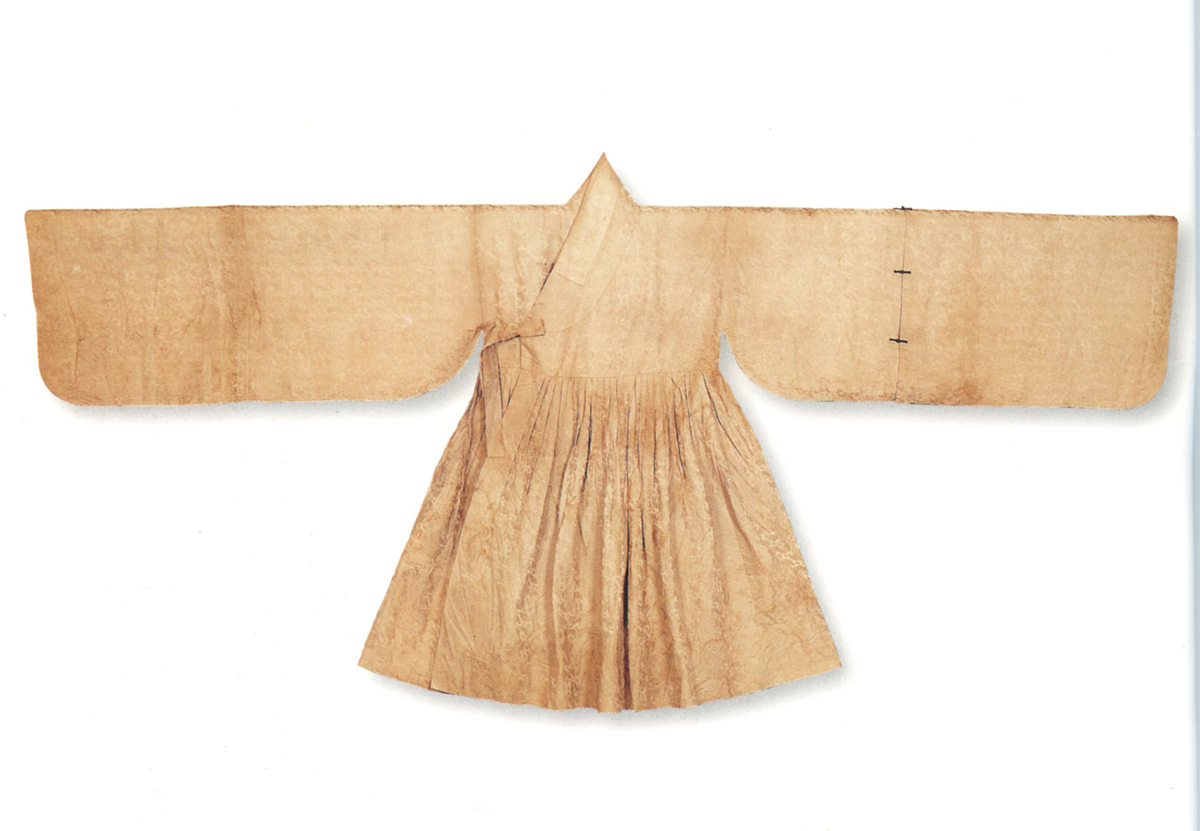
Joseon dynasty Cheolick (철릭).

In Joseon, the terlig was written as ch'ŏmni (帖裡; possibly pronounced tieli in Middle Korean) in a book on music called Akhak gwebom and was possibly pronounced as tieli in Middle Korean; there is an illustration of a coat with folds and a waistband in the same book. Some forms of terlig in Joseon were bestowed clothing from China. The term terlig was written as ch'ŏmni (帖裏) in the Annals of the Joseon dynasty from 1424 AD to describe presents given from China's Ming dynasty or to describe military uniforms. In 1444 during the reign of King Sejong, a set of daily clothing was bestowed to the King by the Ming dynasty which included the dapho, cheolick, and gollyongpo. The Joseon court also bestowed cheolick to its official, including dallyeong, dapho, and cheolick.

In Joseon, the terlig developed further with the disappearance of the waistband along with the increase in sleeve width. After the 17th century, the bodice of the terlig became shorter than the length of the skirt and formed a high-waistline style. In Joseon, the cheollik was a form of court clothing (gwanbok); it was worn by the kings and by civil and military officials.

=== Ilkhanate (1256–1335 AD) ===
The terlig appears to have been fashionable in the Ilkhanate court.

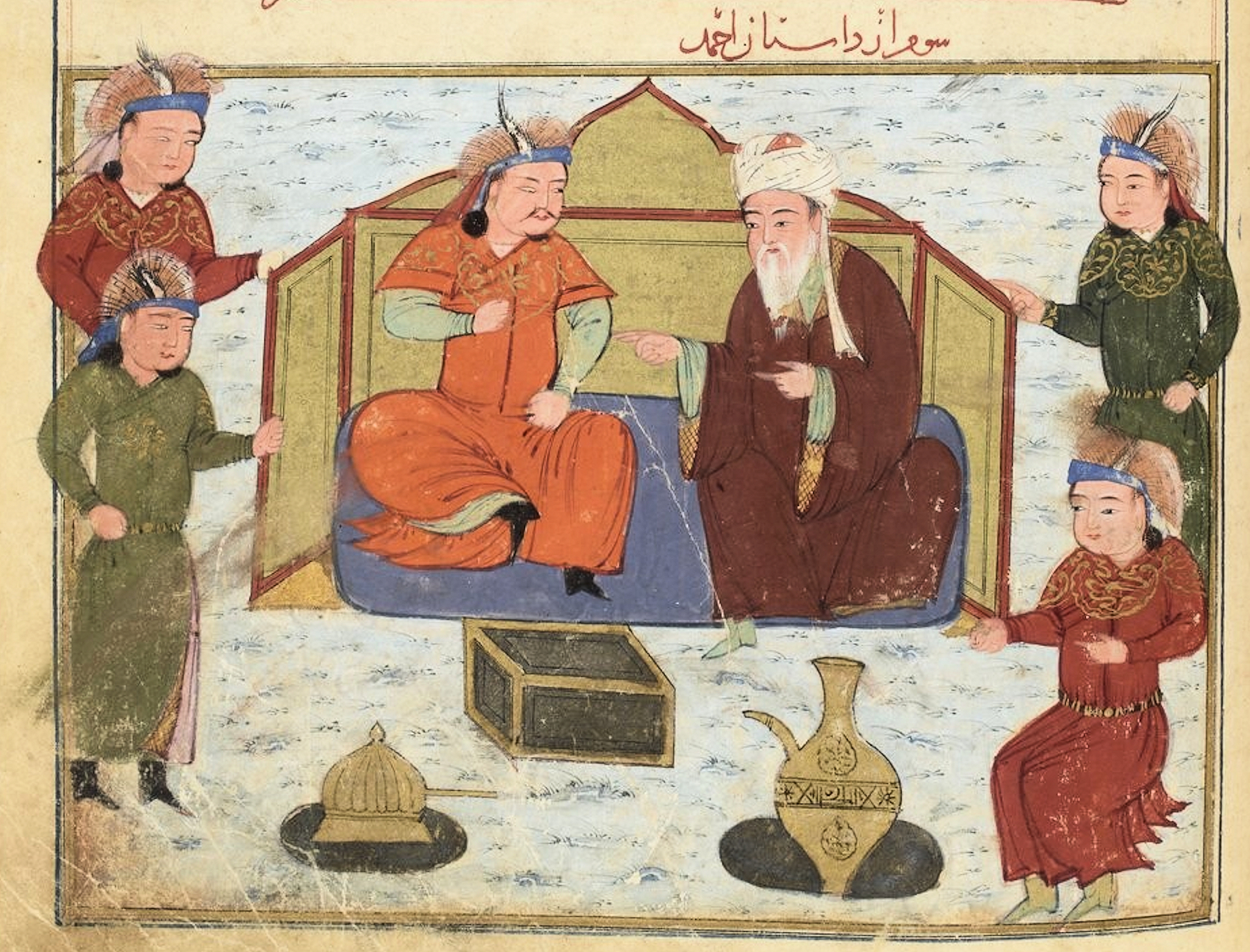
Tekuder and Shams ad-Din Juvayni. Jami' al-tawarikh, Rashid al-Din, painting dating from c.1430 AD.

The terlig worn in the Ilkhanate were slightly different from the ones in the China's Yuan dynasty despite some similarities in terms of shapes and while some were also decorated with Central or East-Asian motifs (e.g. cloud collar designs, Central or East Asian-style dragons, phoenixes and flowers such as lotus, chrysanthemum) which were introduced in West Asia during the Mongol period.

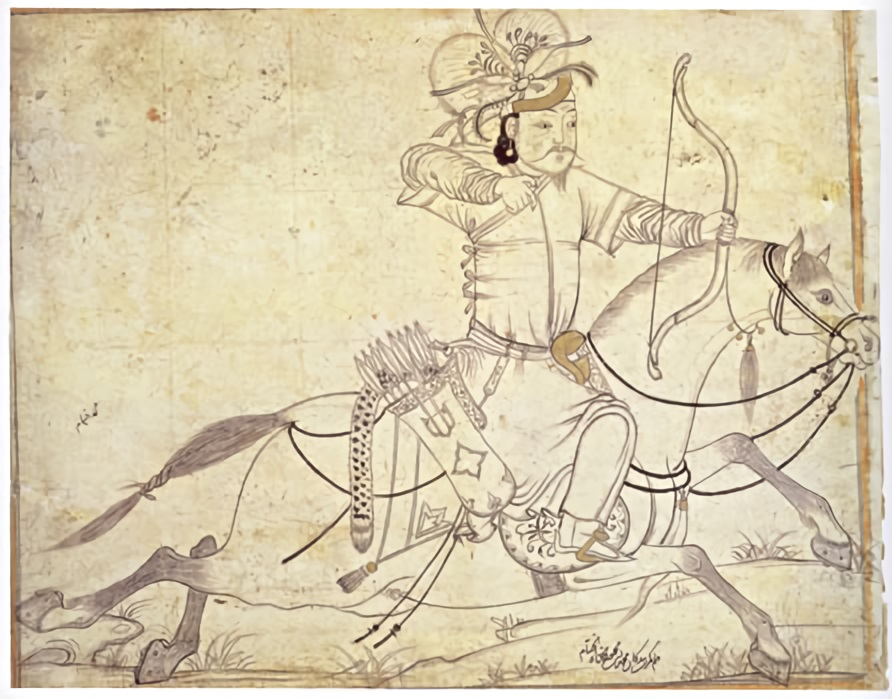
A Timurid drawing of an Ilkhanid horse archer, 15th century AD.

The terlig worn in the Ilkhnate regions had a combination of both Mongol and Islamic culture characteristics, such as roundel patterns and pseudo-Kufic inscription. The main differences from the Yuan dynasty terlig is the presence of tirāz bands in the forms of strips and in the way some of the clothing were worn together. The Islamic influences led to the implementation of bands (possibly reinforcement strips) along the shoulders and the arms. The terlig in the Ilkhanate was worn as an inner garment under a short-sleeved, outer coat. The waist-decoration also appears to have been less common in the Ilkhanate than in the Yuan dynasty. The collars could also be found in different shapes, such standing collars; this marked another difference from those on the terligs worn in the Yuan dynasty.

=== Timurid Court (1370–1507 AD) ===
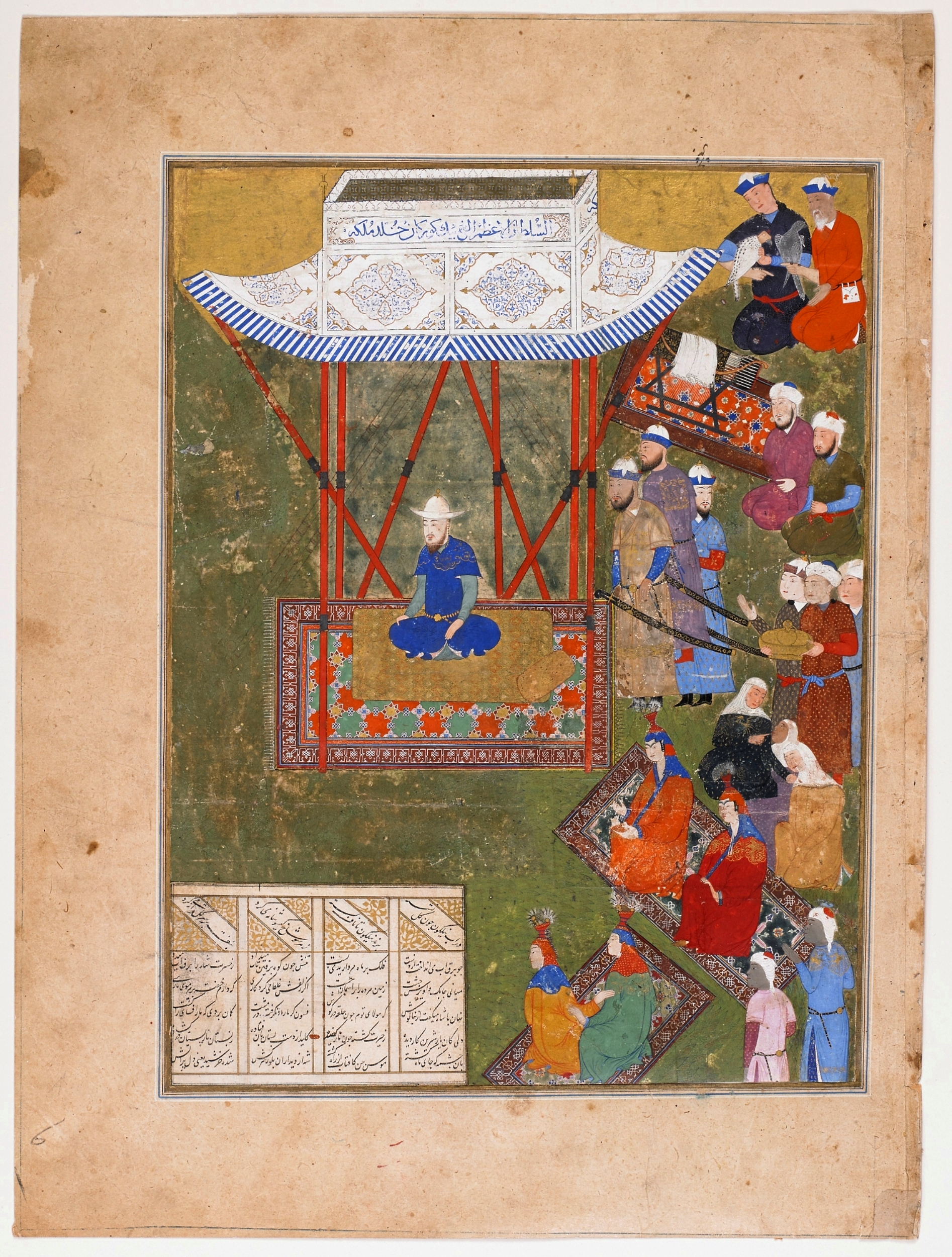
Ulugh Beg and retainers wearing Mongol clothing, Timurid 1425-50

Mongol clothing and Mongol-style clothing continued to appear in Timurid art, such as illustration; this may indicate that Mongol clothing or Mongol-style clothing may have been adopted or worn in the Central Asian Timurid Court. However, this subject needs to be studied further.

=== Mughal Empire (1526–1858 AD) ===
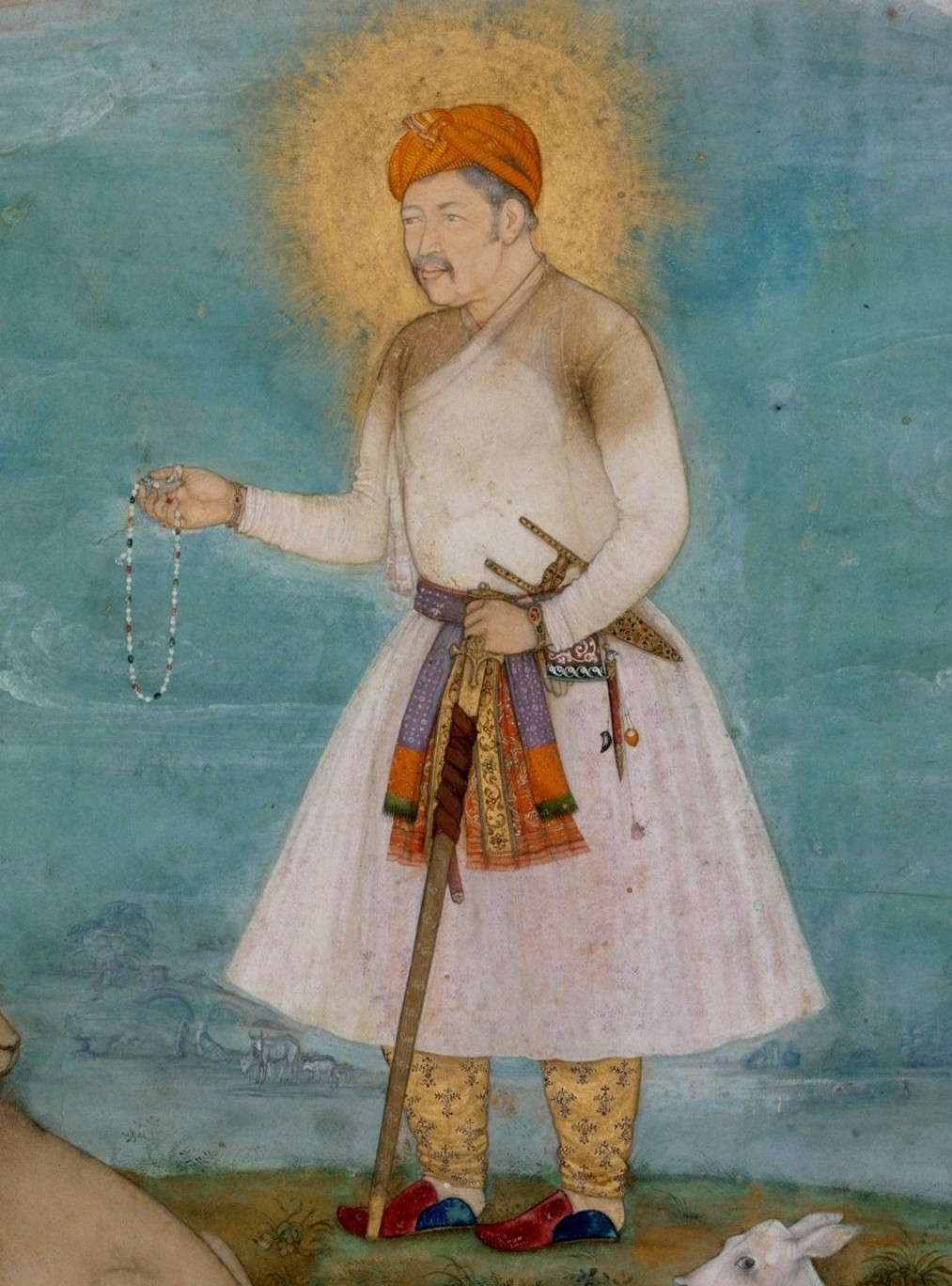
Emperor Akbar wearing a jama.

In the Mughal Empire, the terlig was called jama (also written as jamah). The jama was later renamed to sarbgati (which means 'covering the whole body') by Emperor Akbar himself. The jama was initially worn by the Muslim ruling class at the Mughal court. The jama was developed as part of the introduction of the Islamic culture in India and was perceived as being part of the new appropriation of Islamic identity rather than Mongol culture.

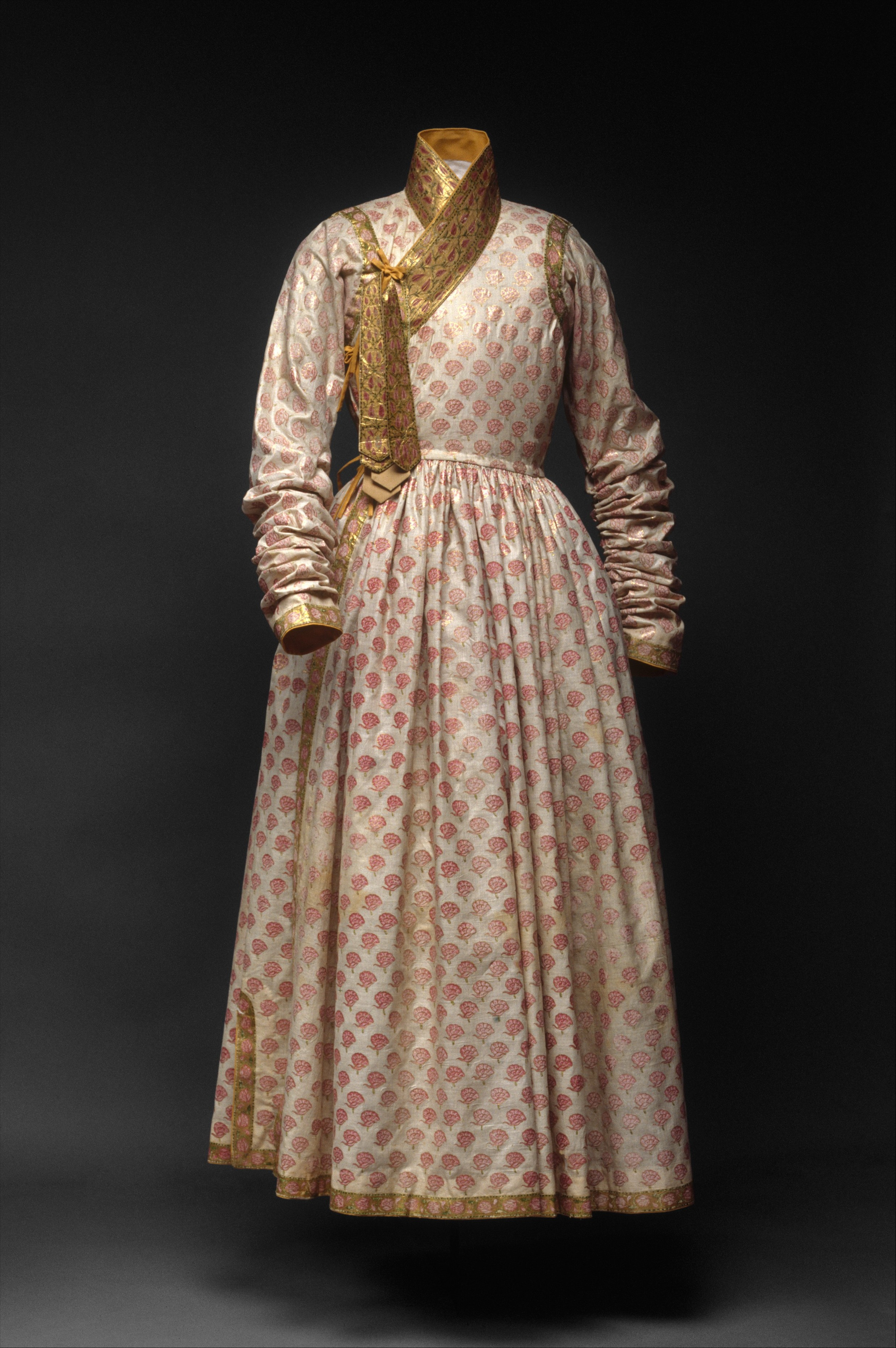
Man's robe (jama) with poppies, India.

Prior to the reign of Emperor Akbar, Mughal clothing was only influenced by geographical conditions and the differences in climate and was not influenced by Indian culture. It only at the time of Emperor Akbar that alteration of Mughal clothing started to take place.

Emperor Akbar encouraged all of his citizens to wear the jama and created new clothing regulations in order to integrate the Muslim and local Hindu populations; the direction of the coat fastening differentiated the Indus and the Muslims. The Indus fastened their jama to the left side while the Muslims fastened it to the right side, similarly to the Mongols.

The jama was a clothing which showed hybridity with the local culture of India. The jama was a long coat with folds around the waistline without the waistband; it had very long, tight sleeves and the waistline was higher than the original Mongol terlig. The jama was long and could either be knee-length or ankle-length.

A new style of clothing was later developed by Emperor Akbar by mixing the Indian Takwchiyah clothing of the Rajput and the foreign jama to create a long robe which could be knee-length or longer with a round skirt without any slits.

== Similar garments ==
- Feiyufu
- Jisün
- Yesa

== See also ==
- Fashion in Yuan dynasty
- Hanfu
