= Feiyufu =

Traditional Chinese robe with the embroidery of a flying-fish

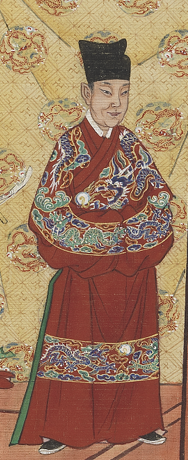
- Man wearing a feiyufu.
- Traditional Chinese: 飛魚服
- Simplified Chinese: 飞鱼服
- Literal meaning: flying fish garment
Transcriptions
Standard Mandarin
- Hanyu Pinyin: fēiyúfú

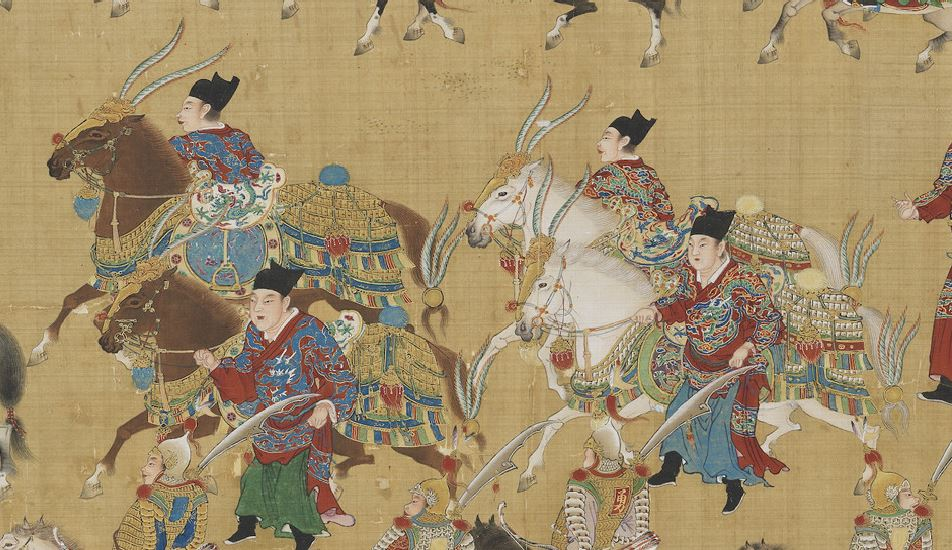
Feiyufu worn by attendants during imperial procession.

Feiyufu (traditional Chinese: 飛魚服; simplified Chinese: 飞鱼服; pinyin: fēiyúfú; lit. 'flying fish garment'), also called feiyu mangyi (飞鱼蟒衣; 'flying-fish python robe'), is a type of traditional Han Chinese clothing (hanfu) which first appeared in the Ming dynasty. The term refers to a robe (generally a tieli) decorated with motifs of the Chinese mythological flying fish, a dragon-like piscine creature (not the zoological flying fish). The feiyufu worn by the Ming dynasty imperial guards was revived in the 21st century following the hanfu movement and is now worn by hanfu enthusiasts of both genders.

== Feiyu embroidery design ==
The feiyu ('flying fish') decoration looks very similar to the mang (python) pattern on the mangfu ('python robe'), but was actually a mythological dragon-like creature with wings and the fanned tail of a fish. The feiyu also had 4 claws like the mang, a dragon head, a carp's body, and two horns.

The early feiyu ornaments were characterized by the presence of two claws (with four digits), fish fins instead of hind legs, a pair of wings, ventral fins, and a curled fish tail. However, in the middle and late Ming dynasty, the feiyu's body evolved completely into that of a python. In effect, Ming artisans deliberately redesigned the feiyu by using the Chinese dragon as a reference and introducing targeted modifications. It could only be distinguished by the presence of its fish tail instead of a dragon tail.

== Construction and design ==
The feiyufu is typically in the form of tieli (a robe with a y-shaped cross collar, with either broad or narrow sleeves and pleats below the waist) decorated with the feiyu pattern.

== History ==
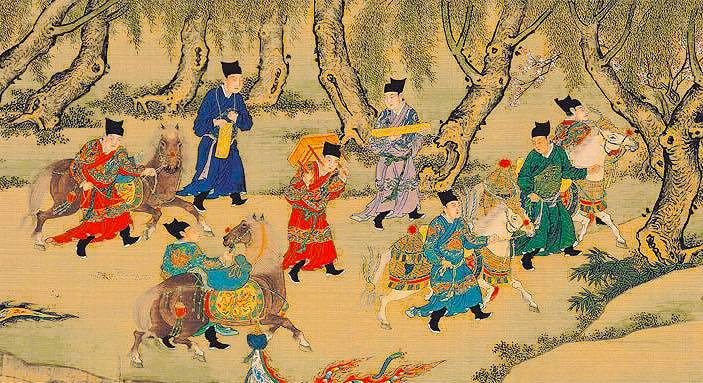
Jinyiwei wearing feiyufu, Ming Dynasty.

=== Ming dynasty ===
The tieli (贴里) originated in the Yuan dynasty in a form of Mongol robe known as terlig. Despite the repeated prohibition of Mongol-style clothing, especially during the reign of the Hongwu Emperor, some Mongol clothing from the Yuan dynasty remained. After being adopted in the Ming dynasty, the tieli became longer and its overall structure was made closer to the shenyi system in order to integrate Han Chinese rituals.

The feiyufu appeared in the Ming dynasty and was unique to the Ming dynasty. It is a form of tieli decorated with flying fish patterns. The feiyufu was also a type of cifu (赐服; 'presentation clothes'), a form of clothing which can only be bestowed by the Chinese emperors to those whom he favoured, and were second only to the mangfu.

== List of people bestowed with feiyufu ==
In the Ming dynasty, the feiyufu could be worn by a handful of civil officials, military officers, and chief eunuchs:

- Under the rule of the Yongle Emperor (r. 1402 –1424 AD), the eunuchs were allowed feiyufu when they would serve the emperor.
- In 1447 AD during the reign of the Zhengtong Emperor, the Ministry of Works issued an edict which would put artisans to death and send artisan's families to frontier garrisons as soldiers should the artisan produce feiyufu among other prohibited clothing for commoners. The edict was issued to stop the transgressing of dress regulations.
- Emperor Zhengde (r. 1505 – 1521 AD) bestowed a feiyufu to Song Suqing, a Japanese envoy, in an unprecedented act.
- Shen Defu (1578 –1642 AD) also noted the emperor would could bestow a red feiyufu to a guard which was promoted to court guard. He also wrote in "the beginnings of the bestowals of dragon robes to Grand Secretaries" that the feiyufu was bestowed to the six ministers, the grand marshals with the mission to inspect troops, and to the eunuchs who were servicing in the houses of princes.

== In popular culture ==
The feiyufu and feiyufu-style guzhuang are depicted in Chinese television drama, especially period drama set in the Ming dynasty such as:

- Flying Swords of Dragon Gate (2011)
- Under the Power (2019)
- The Sleuth of the Ming Dynasty (2020)
- Royal Feast (2022)

== Similar clothing ==
- Douniufu
- Mangfu
- Jisün
- Terlig
- Yesa

== See also ==
- Hanfu
- List of hanfu
- Chinese ornamental gold silk
