= Silk industry in China =

The process of making silk from Sericulture by Liang Kai, Southern Song dynasty, c. 13th century

China is the world's largest and earliest silk producer. The vast majority of Chinese silk originates from the mulberry silkworms (Bombyx mori). During the larval stage of its life cycle, the insects feed on the leaves of mulberry trees. Non-mulberry silkworm cocoon production in China primarily focuses on wild silk from the Chinese Tussah moth (Antheraea spp.). This moth typically feeds on trees (e.g. oaks) and its larvae spin coarser, flatter, yellower filament than the mulberry silkworms.

== History ==
Following World War II, the redevelopment of the silk industry was one of the few economic successes of China's Nationalist government under Chiang Kai-shek.

In 2005, China accounted for 74 percent of the global raw silk production and 90 percent of the world export market.

== Industrial plans ==
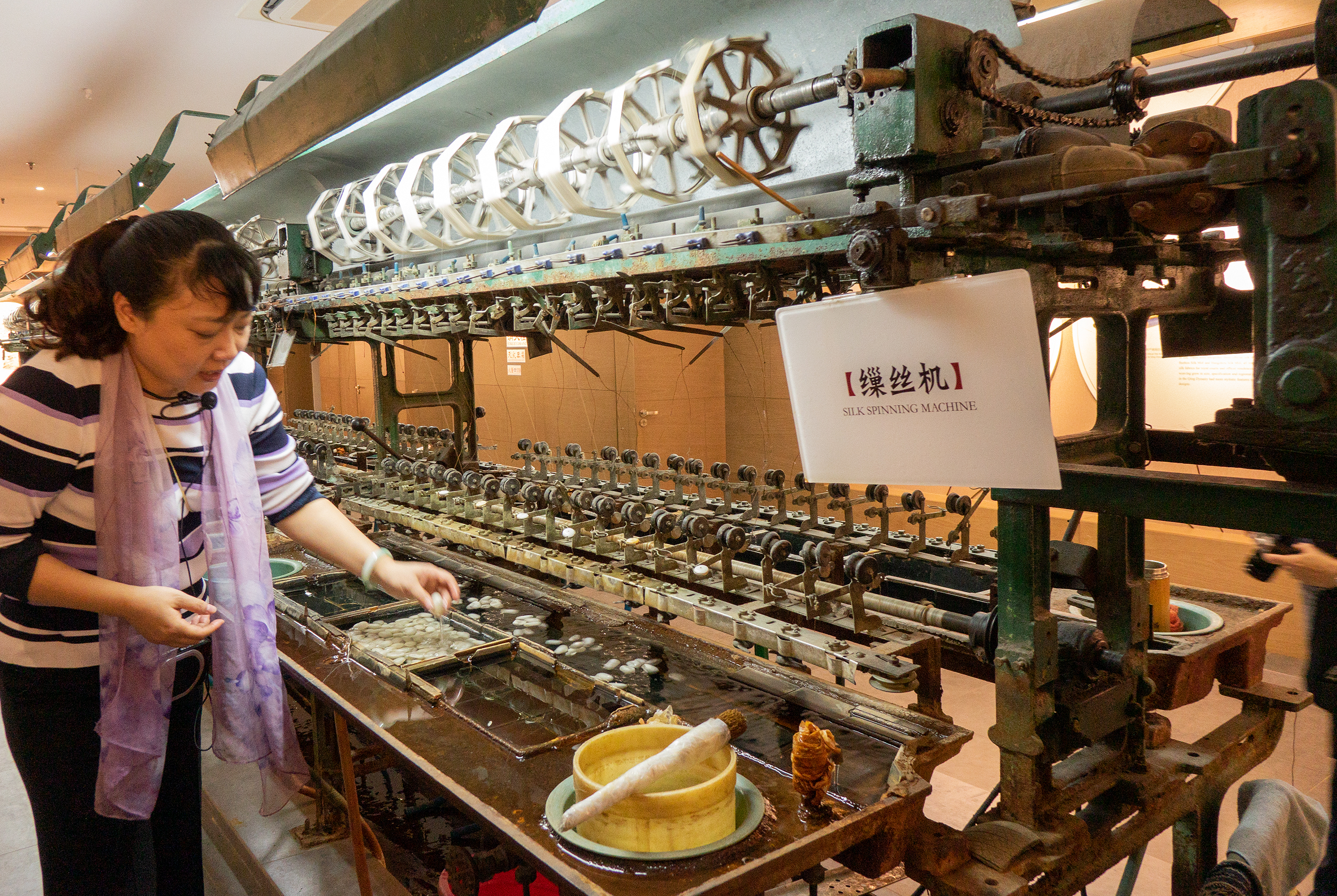
Silk spinning mill, Suzhou, China

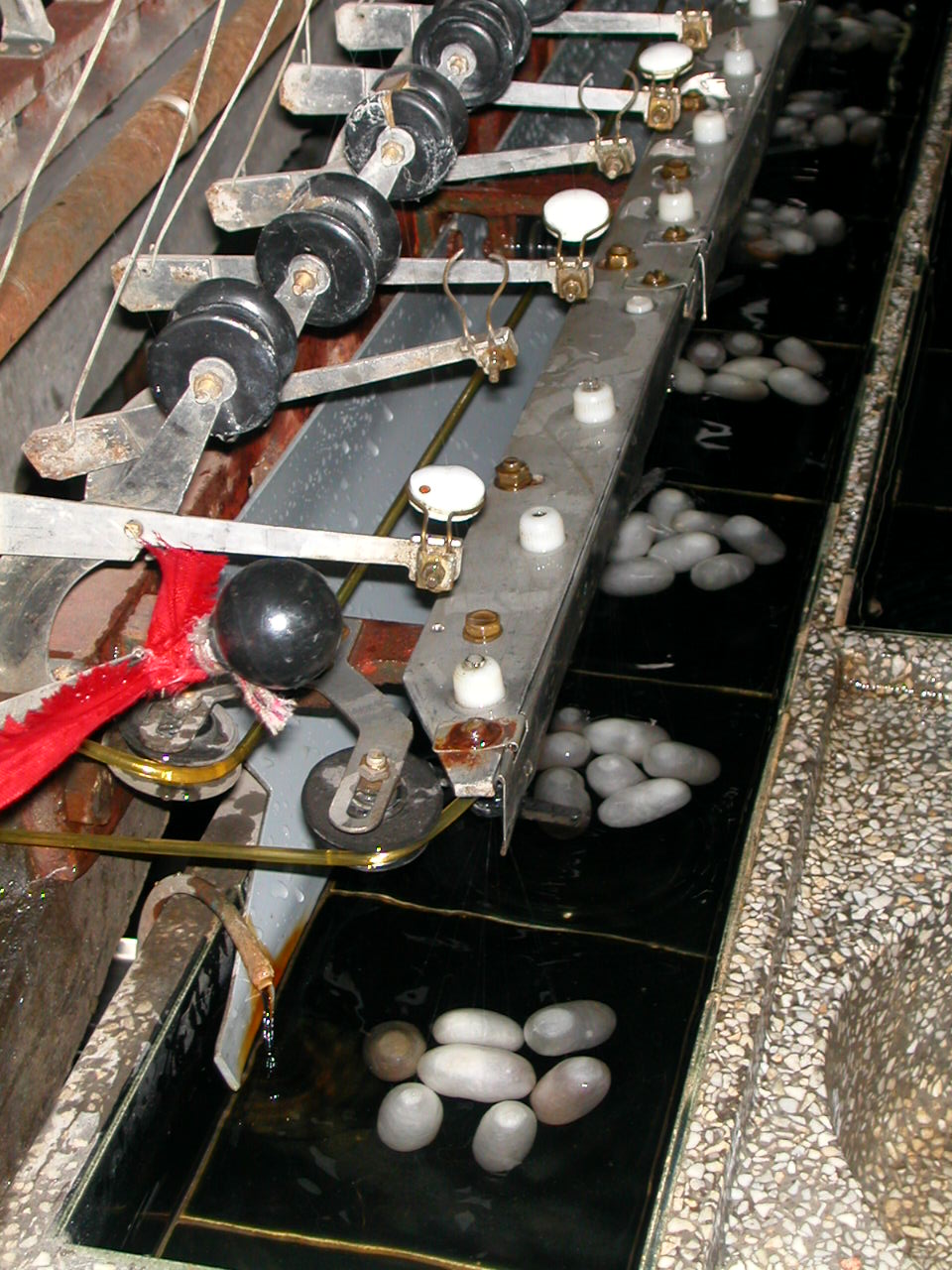
The filaments of six cocoons are used to form one thread for spinning silk (Suzhou, 1987)

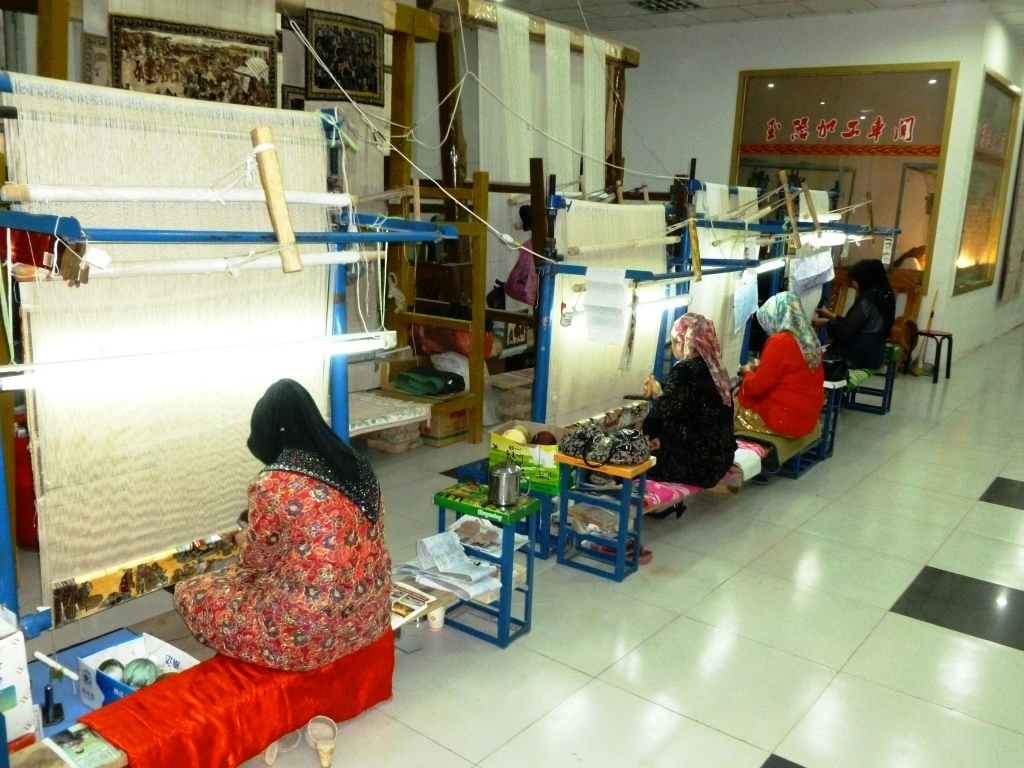
Women weaving silk. Kashgar

Local governments have and are continuing to introduce new facilities that are expected to bring in latest high-end silk manufacturing machinery that will elevate both the quality and the quantity of the silk being produced in China. It is estimated that it will render significant revenue increases as its new facilities bring increased production and distribution capabilities.

The Chinese government provides a range of preferential policies supporting the silk industry, including land policy exemptions, tax breaks, project prioritization (priority in review and approval of applications), and energy discounts (upon approval, company can receive discounts of fees related to water, electric, gas, etc.). In the recent years, despite exporting extensively abroad, most Chinese productions are consumed domestically.

== Geography ==
Different from the East coast of China, the silk industry has more emphasis on silk reprocessing, Western parts is more focused on raw silk production due to its natural weather and soil conditions, mostly in Sichuan and Yunnan areas. Also as the land cost and manpower cost is increasing on the east coast, business is shifting to the west. With the government's preferential policies, Chongqing's silk industry has seen some significant developments. It is thought that silk was exported along the Silk Road routes by 400BC or so.

== Foreign investment ==
Foreign investment has helped develop the silk industry. Foreign investment has optimized the structure of local silk companies, and brought in new technology.

== See also ==
- China Western Development
- Chinese ornamental gold silk
- History of silk
- Sericulture
