= Jisün =

Single-coloured Mongol robe

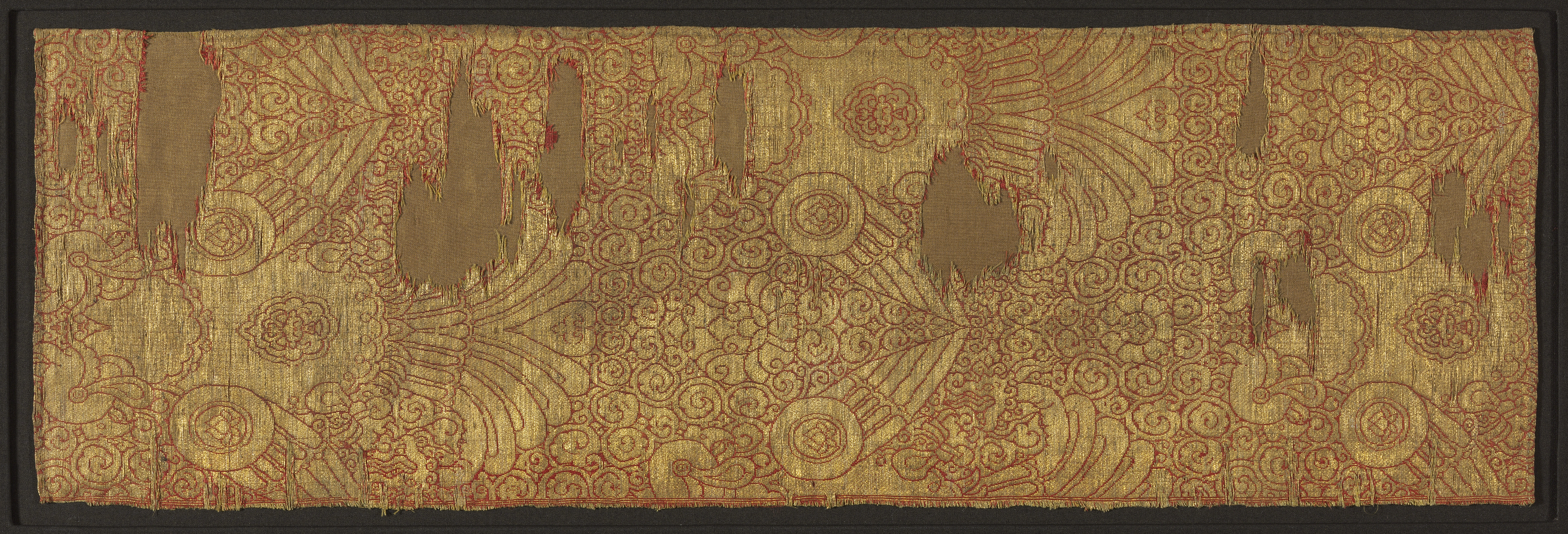
- Textile fragment of the Mongol cloth of gold with falcons
- Chinese: 济孙
Transcriptions
Standard Mandarin
- Hanyu Pinyin: Jìsūn

Jisün, also known as zhisun-fu (Chinese: 质孙服) or zhisun (simplified Chinese: 质孙; traditional Chinese: 質孫, also written as 只孙 or 直孙), zhixun (只逊), jixun (济逊), zhama (诈玛; 詐馬; Persian: جامه, romanized: jāma) or Jisun (济孙), was a very important male Mongol garment during the Yuan dynasty and jisün was a type of terlig. They were also known as Mongol robes of honour (khil'at). The jisün was a form of ceremonial clothing, which was worn during the jisün banquets (also known as zhama banquets), which were the most important ceremony of the Yuan dynasty court . Jisün were made of textile woven with gold and silk of one colour. In China, the jisün was introduced during the Yuan dynasty and the Ming dynasty continued to employ it. In both the Yuan and Ming dynasties, the jisün was a single-coloured court robe.

== Terminology ==
The Chinese term zhama was borrowed from Persian jāma 'garment, robe, coat, clothing'. Mongolian Jisün means 'colour'. The term jisün was the loan form in Mandarin. In the History of Yuan, the jisün is defined as a dress, being, or robe of the same colour (一色服; yisefu).'

== History ==
=== Origins ===
The jisün likely originated in the early period of Mongol rule; it was first introduced under Genghis Khan, but it became more elaborate after Kublai Khan established the Yuan.

=== Yuan dynasty ===
In the Yuan dynasty, the jisün was worn by emperors and officials. It was a ceremonial court dress which bestowed by emperors to higher-ranking officials, imperial relatives, those who had made great contributions, and those who served the emperors . It could only be worn when bestowed by the emperor, and as such, it held an important place for every official's political life. A jisün bestowed by the Emperor had to be worn.

In 1321, during the rule of Gegeen Khan, a jisün dress code was officially formulated. This dress code also combined the clothing characteristics of both Han Chinese and Mongol ethnicities.

In 1332 AD, an imperial edict stated that all officials and imperial guards who had been bestowed with jisün were required to wear it during the imperial banquets, and those would pawn off their jisün would be punished. Distinguished higher-ranking imperial officials, in particular, wore it when they would meet with the Emperors or when they would attend banquets. The jisün worn by the Han Chinese who would participate in the banquets organized by the Yuan imperial court were also bestowed by the Yuan Emperors. The participants of the jisun banquets had to be dressed in the same colour.

The jisün could also be worn by lower-ranking singers, musicians, and security guards. However, it appears that there were two kind of jisün during the banquets: the first type which was worn as a formal dress for the Yuan Emperors, his officials and the nobilities, and the second type which was worn by the servants.

=== Ming dynasty ===
In the Ming dynasty, the jisün was mainly worn as regular clothing by military officials, such as the court guards and guards of honour, who are referred as xiaowei (校尉). In 1373, the clothing of the imperial body guards had been changed to the jisün.

According to Collected Statutes of the Ming Dynasty and the Writings after a dream in Shining Spring (春明梦余录), the xiaowei all wore jisün robes. According to the Collected Statutes of the Ming Dynasty, the Embroidered Uniform Guard who were on duty at the East and West City circuit and the other men in charge of whip-throwing, fan-holding, umbrella-like towel-holding also wore the jisün. According to Understanding Elegance, the red or green robes which were made out of silk and which were worn by the Embroidered Uniform Guard were called zhixun; the zhixun was decorated with ground flowers.

== Design and construction ==
The jisün is described as being of a single colour. The jisün worn by the Yuan emperor and higher-ranking officials during court banquets typically had the same colour, design and form, with the workmanship and exquisiteness of ornaments as the difference. All the jisün worn by Han Chinese during court banquets had the same form and design. According to the History of the Yuan, the jisün is described as not having a fixed design or form, and the summer design is different from the winter design. Jisün were also different in design depending on the social classes of their wearer. For example, the emperor had eleven varieties for the winter season and fifteen varieties for summer, while members of the nobility and the senior officials had nine varieties of jisün during winter and fourteen in summer. Jisün could also be made from variety of fabrics, including nasīj (or nasji; 納石失; Nàshíshī, probably gold-woven lampas), silk, and wool (速夫; sufu). They were also embellished with precious stones and pearls.

In the "Great statutes of statecraft" (經世大典; Jingshi dadian) by Yu Ji (1272–1348) recorded that the "zhisun is the robe worn by high officials when they attend an imperial banquet. Nowadays it takes the form of a bright red robe with a string of large pearls sewn on the back and shoulders [...]".

== Derivatives and influences ==
=== China ===
The yesa robe, which was a new form of garment in the Ming dynasty, has some of elements developed either from the terlig or from the jisün (itself as a form of terlig).

== Similar garments ==
- Feiyufu
- Terlig
- Yesa robe

== See also ==
- Fashion in the Yuan dynasty
- List of hanfu
- Hanfu
- Robe of honour - an ancient tradition of bestowing clothing
- Khalat - a loose, long-sleeved outer silk or cotton robe common in Central Asia and South Asia
