= Mianguan =

Type of crown with a flat top worn in East Asia

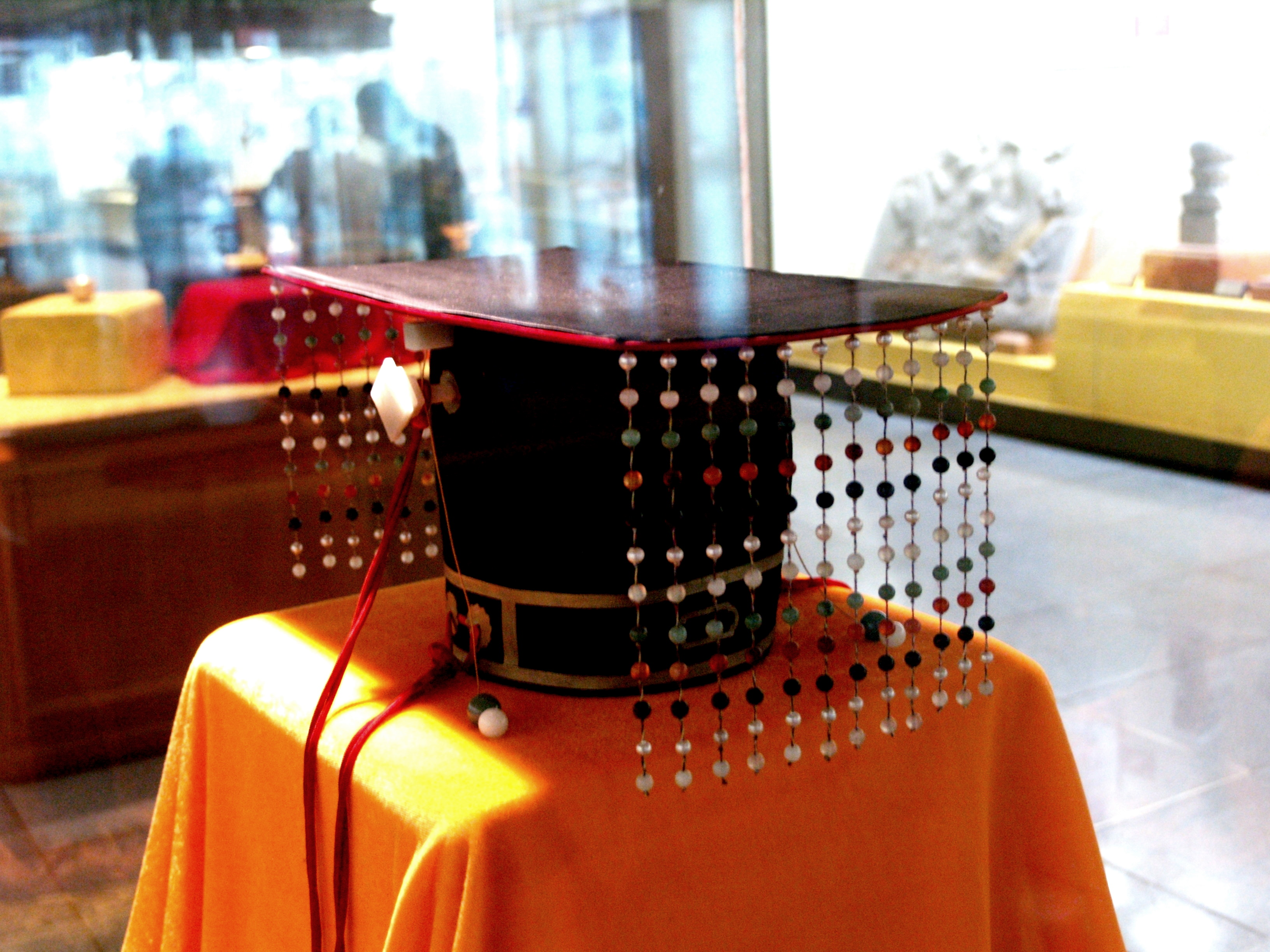
A mianguan in the Ding Ling Tomb Museum within the Ming Tombs

The mianguan (Chinese: 冕冠; pinyin: miǎnguān; lit. 'ceremonial headdress'), also pronounced benkan in Japan, myeonlyugwan in Korea, and Miện quan in Vietnam, is a type of crown traditionally worn by the emperors of China, Japan, Korea, and Vietnam, as well as other kings in East Asia.

Originating in China, the mianguan was worn by the emperor, his ministers, and aristocrats. The mianguan was the most expensive Chinese headware, reserved for important sacrificial events. Regulations on its shape and its making were issued under the Eastern Han dynasty and applied in the succeeding dynasties only to be ended at the fall of the Ming dynasty in the 17th century AD.

In Japan, emperors and nobles wore gold, silver, and gilt-bronze crowns, influenced by the Korean peninsula, from the Kofun period (mid 3rd century-7th century). In the 8th century, influenced by the Chinese mianguan, the unique benkan was born, a metal crown with chains and a sun-shaped ornament at the top.

It is also worn in Vietnam, (Note: The crown of the emperor during the Nguyễn dynasty is housed in the Vietnam National Museum of History.) and the monarchs of the Joseon dynasty also wore an equivalent crown, the myeonlyugwan.

== Mianguan (China) ==
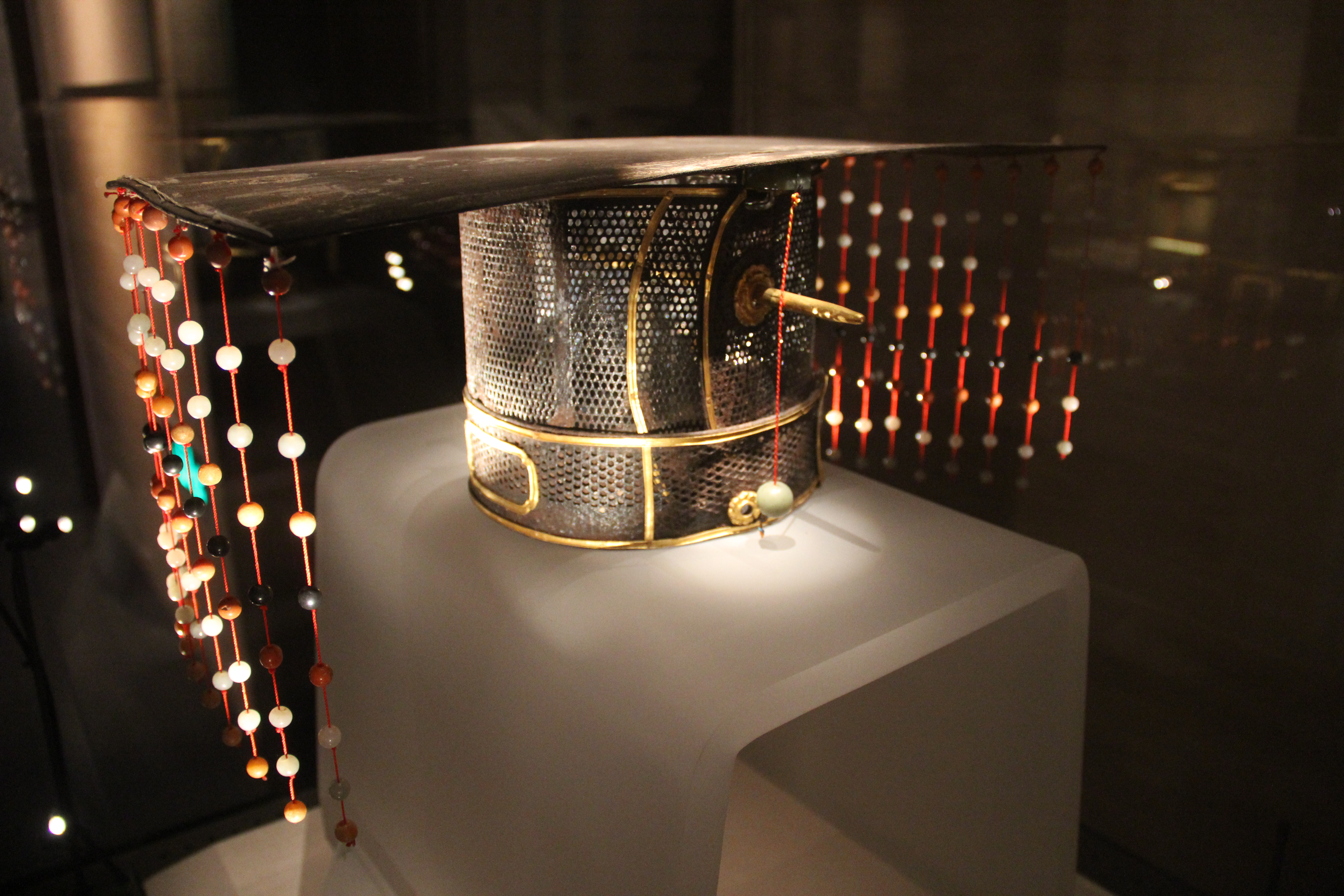
Mianguan from the tomb of Ming dynasty prince Zhu Tan, 10th son of the Hongwu Emperor

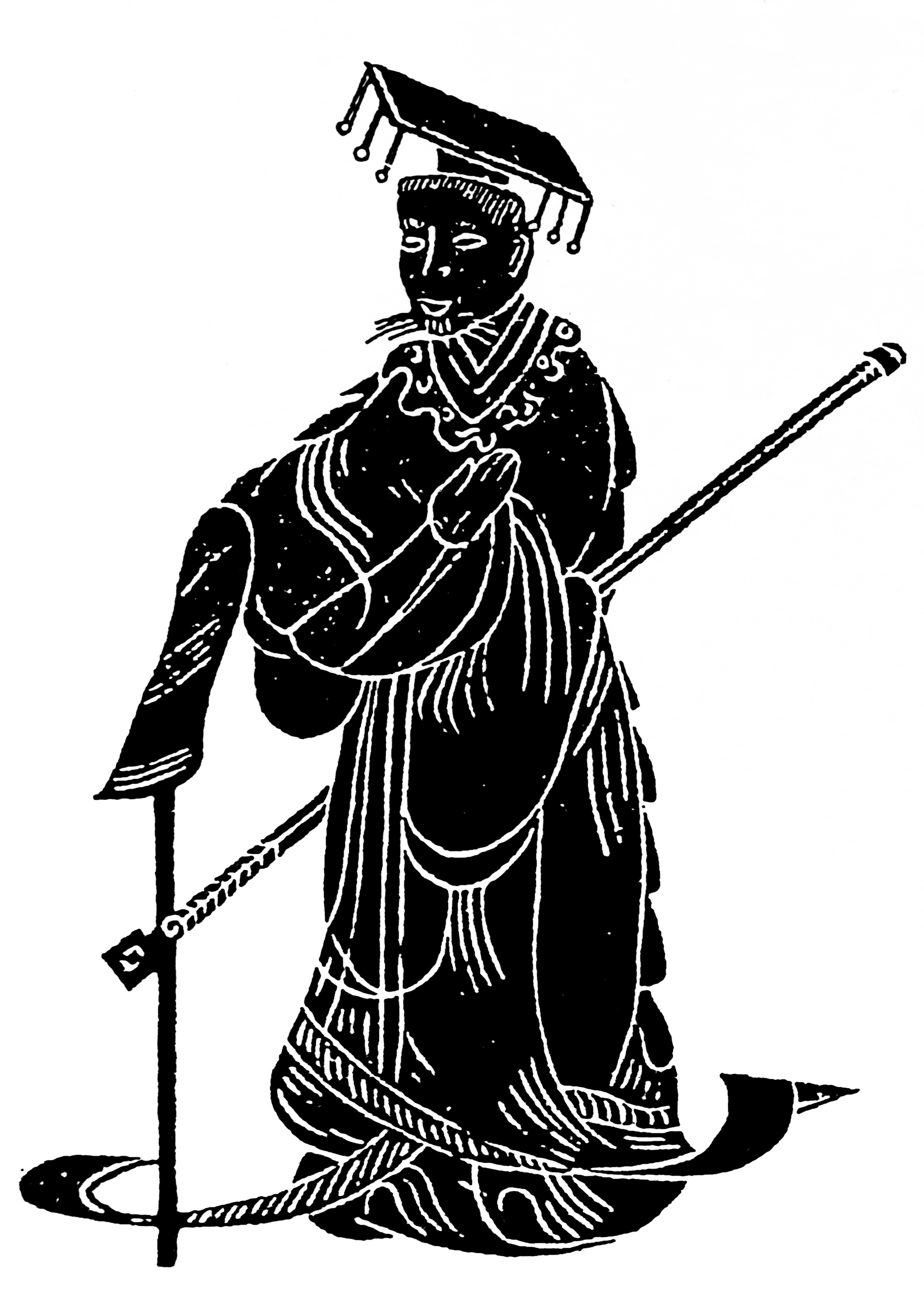
Tracing of figure wearing mianguan in Yinan Tomb stone-relief in Shandong Province.

Among all the type of Chinese headwear, the mianguan was the most expensive type; it was reserved especially for important sacrificial events.

The mianguan and the mianfu were worn beginning in the Zhou dynasty, based on the ceremonial and ritual-culture of Zhou that prescribes which types of clothing and accessories could be worn by the different social ranks and during different occasions.

=== Zhou dynasty ===
In the Rites of Zhou, there is a description of the ceremonial dress and crowns worn by the kings of the Zhou dynasty. According to the description, kings had six types of ceremonial dress (六冕, lit. 'six mian') according to their rituals, all of which were worn with a mian (冕, lit. 'crown'). At that time, it was still called simply mian, not mianguan.

In addition, the mian was also worn by the various lords, such as dukes, marquises, counts, viscounts, and barons, as well as hú (狐, ministerial class), qīng (卿, lit. 'senior officials'), and daiyus.

The Book of Rites also has the following description of the mian:

The king's yùzǎo has twelve chains hanging from the front and back of the yán, and his ceremonial robe has dragon patterns on it, which he wears to worship.

Here the king's crown is called a yùzǎo (玉藻, lit. 'jade and thread'), not a mian (冕).

The word zǎo (藻, lit. 'thread') means silk thread, which is threaded through a jade bead to make a chain. The chains are then attached to the crown, which is why it is called a yùzǎo. At the top of the yùzǎo is a board called a yán (延, lit. 'extension'), from the front and back ends of which hang 12 chains each, or 24 chains in total.

However, the color of the jade and the color and length of the silk threads are unknown from the description in the Book of Rites alone. A commentary on the Book of Rite is the Right Meaning of the Ritual Records (禮記正義, Lǐjì Zhèngyì).

Zheng Xuan's commentary in this book states that the silk threads were of various colors, that the silk threads of the king's mian were of five colors, and that their length was long enough to reach the king's shoulders. However, the color of the jade is not mentioned.

On the other hand, according to the commentary by Kong Yingda (574 – 648) in the same book, the beads of the king's mian are five colors (from top to bottom: vermillion, white, blue, yellow, and black), and the distance between each jade is 1 cun (about 3 cm). (Note: The length of the cun varied from period to period, but in the Tang dynasty, one cun was about 3 cm.) This combination is one set (6 cun, about 18 cm), and the length of the chain is two sets, thus the length of the chain of the king's mian is about 36 cm.

Both Zheng Xuan nor Kong Yingda's commentaries are likely conceptual, based on Confucian principles rather than known excavated or physical examples of mianguan during the Zhou dynasty.

=== Qin dynasty ===
Qin Shi Huang abolished the six types of ceremonial dress of the Zhou dynasty and replaced them with an all-black ceremonial dress called the junxuan (袀玄). (Note: The original source is "秦以戰國即天子位，滅去禮學，郊祀之服皆以袀玄。漢承秦故。” “顯宗遂就大業，初服旒冕，衣裳文章，赤舄絇屨，以祠天地。") However, the exact details of the junxuan, including the crown, are unknown.

=== Han dynasty ===
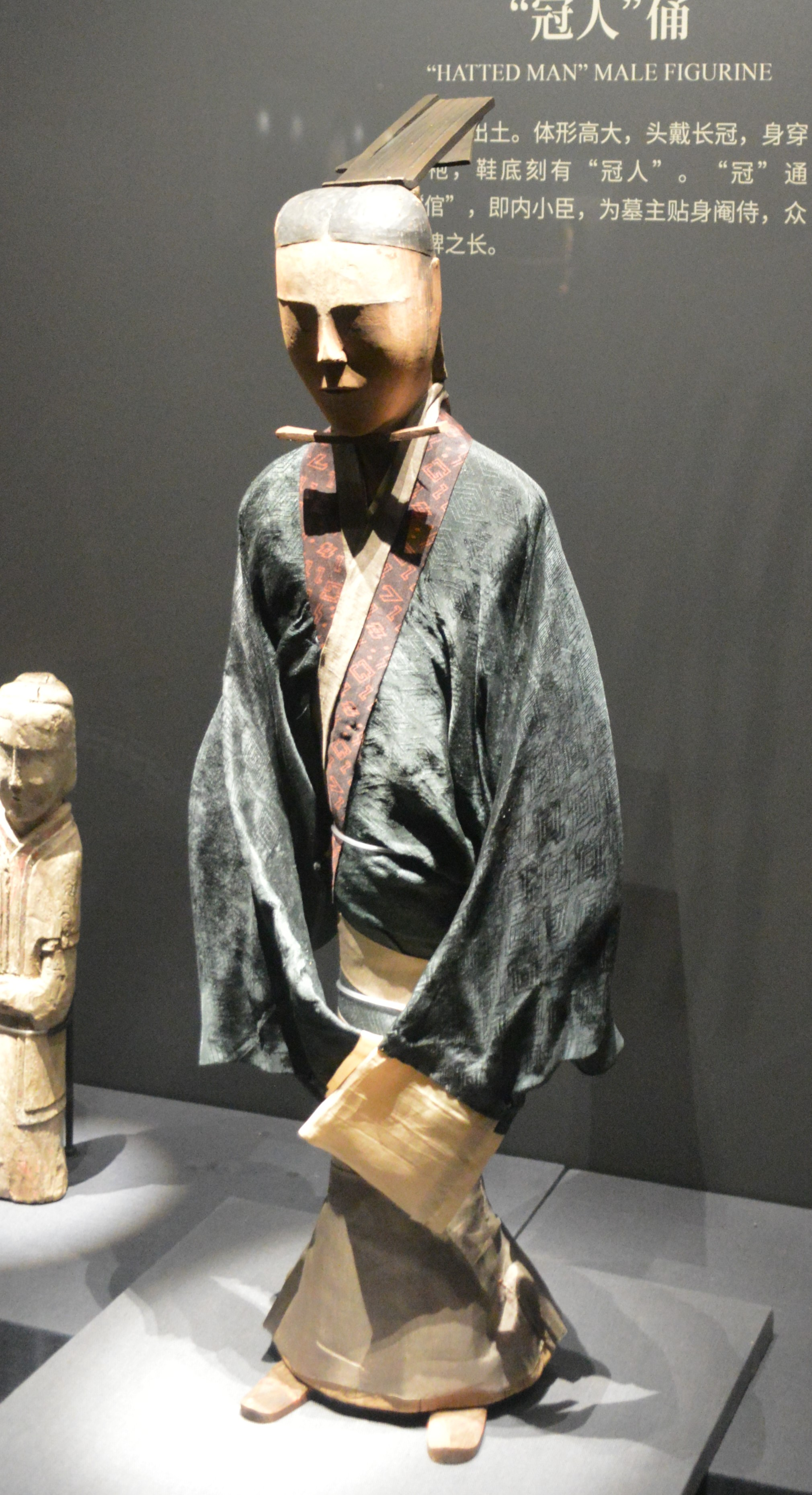
Figure wearing a chángguān, excavated from the Mawangdui, Western Han, 2nd century BC.

In the Western Han dynasty, there was a crown called chángguān (長冠) or zhāiguān (齋冠). The origin of the chángguān is the so-called "Liu's crown" (劉氏冠), which Liu Bang had made from bamboo bark when he was chief of a post, and later wore even after he reached a high rank.

The Qin dynasty junxuan was continued to be worn by emperors of the Han dynasty, until the mianfu was formally restored during the reign of Emperor Ming (reigned 57 - 75) in the Eastern Han dynasty.

According to the Book of the Later Han, the extension (board) at the top of the revived mianguan was 7 cun wide and 1.2 chi long, with a rounded front edge and a square back edge, and the surface of the extension was black and the reverse side was red and green.

The length of the chain hanging from the extension was 4 cun in the front and 3 cun in the back. The color and number of chains were as follows: 12 chains of white jade for the emperor, 7 chains of blue jade for the three dukes and lords, and 5 chains of black jade for high-ranking officials. However, the three dukes and below had only front chains and no back chains.

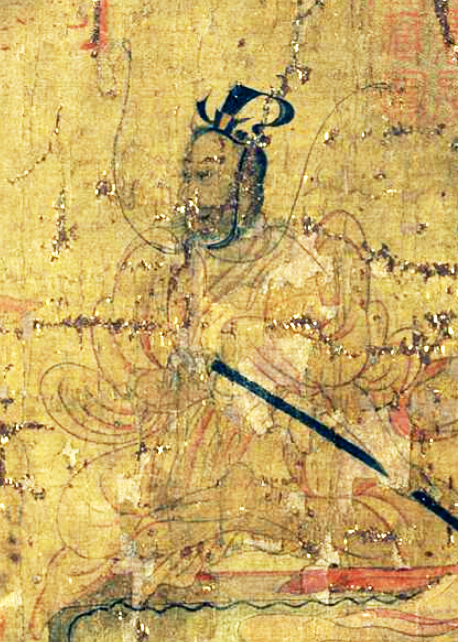
Emperor Yuan of the Western Han dynasty. From the Admonitions Scroll.

According to the Duduan (獨斷) by Cai Yong (132 - 192) of the Eastern Han dynasty, the number of white jade per chain on the mianguan of the reestablished emperors was only one at the bottom end of the chain. (Note: The original text is "係白玉珠於其端.")

Indeed, the mianguan of the emperors depicted in the Thirteen Emperors Scroll by Yan Liben, which depicts emperors from the Eastern Han to the Sui dynasty, have only one white jade at the bottom end of the chain. Also, earplugs, called tǒukuàng (黈纊) also hung down from the crown. This is also depicted in the Thirteen Emperors Scroll.

In Gu Kaizhi's Admonitions Scroll, Emperor Yuan of the Western Han dynasty is depicted, and the crown he wears is thought to be the tongtianguan (通天冠, lit. 'crown that reaches to the heavens'). According to the Book of Later Han, the tongtianguan was a crown usually worn by emperors. Also, according to the book, it is stated that Emperor Ming was the first to wear a tongtianguan, so it is thought that the tongtianguan actually came into use in the Eastern Han dynasty, though sources such as the Book of Jin claims its origin to be from the Qin dynasty.

=== Cao Wei dynasty ===
According to the Book of Jin, Cao Rui, the second emperor of the Cao Wei dynasty, was fond of women's ornaments and changed the white jade beads in the chains to coral beads.

=== Jin dynasty ===
The dress system of the Jin dynasty basically followed that of the Eastern Han dynasty, but changes were made to the mianguan. According to the Book of Jin, a tongtianguan was worn over a black cape, and a mianguan, called a píngmiǎn (平冕, lit. 'flat mianguan'), was placed over the tongtianguan. In the Eastern Han dynasty, the crown was an integral part of the cap and the extension (board), but in the Jin dynasty, it is thought that the crown was changed to a detachable type, with the extension of the mianguan placed on top of the tongtianguan, which was worn daily, at special occasions.

The extension was 7 cun wide and 1.2 chi long, black on the surface and vermilion-green on the reverse, rounded at the front and angular at the rear.

The chain beads initially followed the Cao Wei system and were made of jade and coral in various colors, but Gu He (顧和, 288 - 351) advised the emperor to return to the white jade beads of the Eastern Han dynasty. The number of chains on an emperor's mianguan was 12.

Píngmiǎn were also used by royalty, dukes, and lords. The number of chains was 8 for royalty and dukes and 7 for lords.

=== Liang dynasty ===
In the Liang dynasty, as in the Jin dynasty, the mianguan consisted of a black cape, over which was placed the tongtianguan, and over this was placed the píngmiǎn. This was commonly known as the píngtiānguān (平天冠, lit. 'flat crown of heaven'). The emperor's píngtiānguān had 12 chains made of white jade beads, with the chains 4 cun long in the front and 3 cun long in the back. On each side of the crown hung an ornament resembling earplugs made of jade.

In 508, Emperor Wu of Liang (reigned 502 - 549) reestablished the dàqiúmiǎn (大裘冕, lit. 'great fur mian crown'), the highest of the six crowns mentioned in the Rites of Zhou. Although qiú (裘) refers to sheep's fur, the dàqiúmiǎn's ceremonial dress was black silk for the upper garment and red for the lower garment, both without patterns or embroidery. The mianguan had no chains.

=== Sui dynasty ===
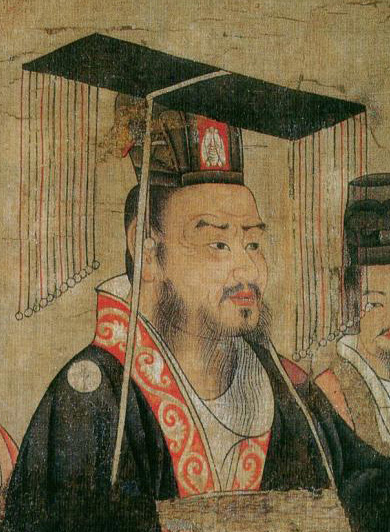
Tang dynasty painting of Liu Bei of Shu wearing the mianguan

Emperor Wen (reigned 581 - 604) of the Sui dynasty, in reference to the appearance of the red sparrow, a sign of good omen, when he received a mandate from heaven, changed the color of the imperial robes worn at court to red, while the gǔnmiǎn (袞冕, imperial dress with dragons and mianguan) worn at rituals remained unchanged. The mianguan was black with 12 chains of white jade beads, chinstrap, tǒukuàng (an ornament resembling earplugs), and hairpin. The emperor's costume was black for the upper garment and red for the lower garment.

In 605, Emperor Yang (reigned 604 - 618) established the dàqiúmiǎn (supreme ceremonial dress of the emperor), just as the Liang dynasty had done. The upper extension of the mianguan was blue on the surface and vermilion on the reverse side, and did not have chains and earplugs attached.

=== Ming dynasty ===
The basic shape of the mianguan remained the same from ancient times to the Ming dynasty. The crown worn by the Ming dynasty's Wanli Emperor has been excavated from the Dingling Mausoleum, while the painting "Illustrated Scrolls of the Emperors of the dynasties" by Yan Liben depicted emperors from the Former Han dynasty to the Sui dynasty, whose mianguan was almost the same shape as the crown depicted, with minor differences in decoration.

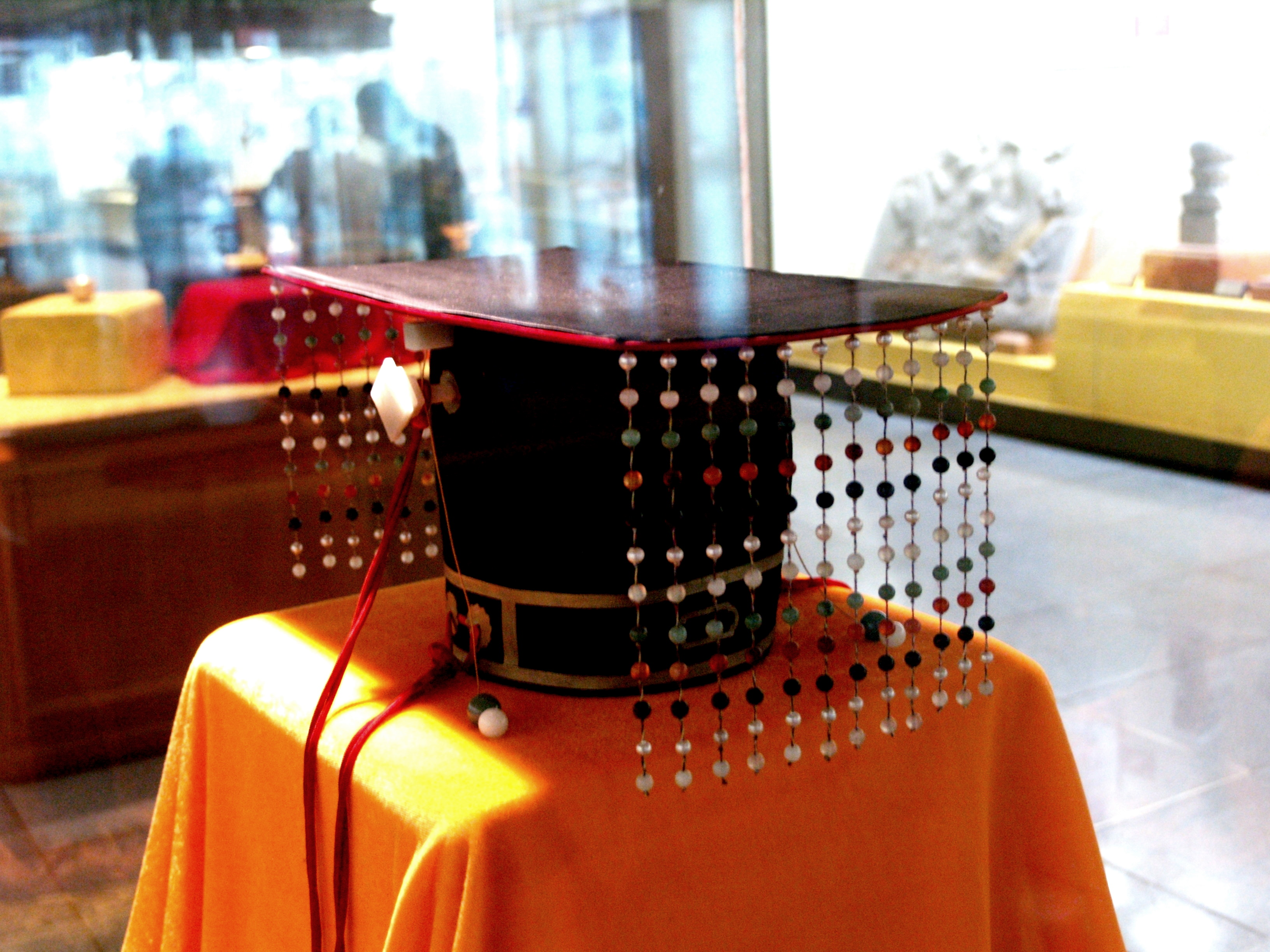
Mianguan excavated from the mausoleum of the Wanli Emperor during the Ming dynasty

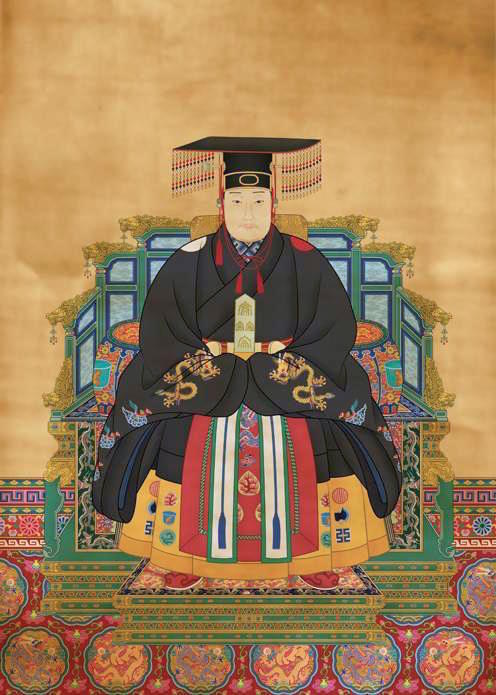
The mianguan of the Wanli Emperor. He is wearing the same mianguan as the mianguan in the left picture.

Many of the non-Han Chinese dynasties that ruled China also adopted the mianguan. (Liao, which did not adopt the ritual system of the Han dynasty, and Yuan, which is considered to have a strong Mongolian flavor, also adopted the mianguan.)

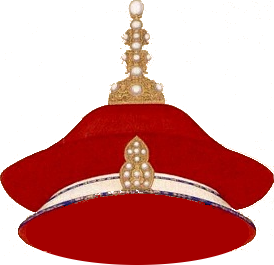

The mianguan stopped being used in China since the fall of the Ming dynasty and the establishment of the Qing dynasty by the Manchu. Instead, a unique Manchu crown called the 'morning crown' (mahala in Manchu) was used. The Manchu crown was shaped like an umbrella, and the top of the crown was decorated with a special pearl-encrusted ornament called the morning pearl.

== Benkan (Japan) ==
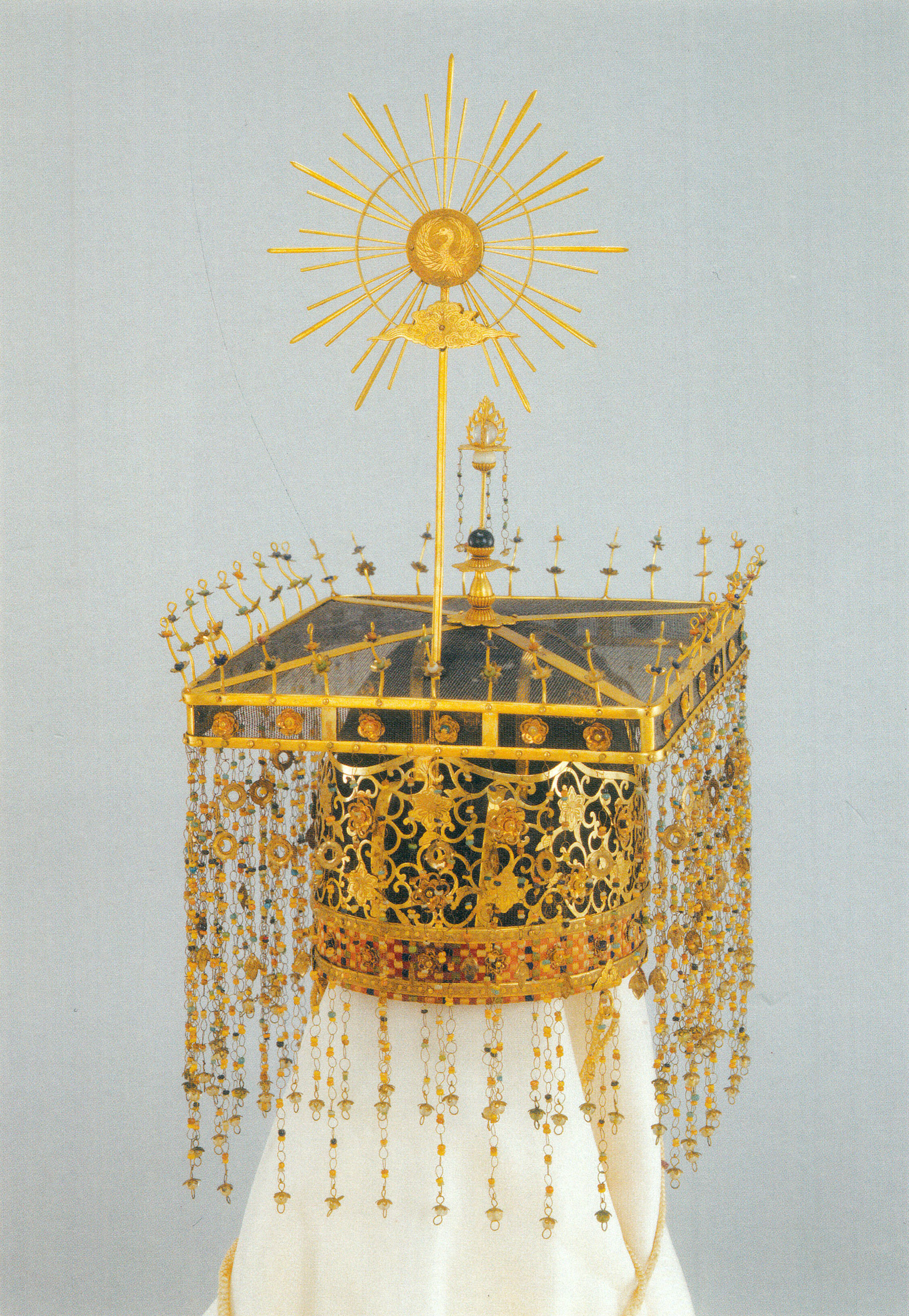
Benkan of Emperor Kōmei

The benkan (冕冠; lit. 'crown') is a type of crown traditionally worn by Japanese emperors and crown princes. It is also called tama no kōburi (玉乃冠; lit. 'jeweled crown').

In ancient Japan, emperors and nobles wore metal crowns made of gold, silver, and gilt bronze under the influence of the Korean Peninsula. In the 8th century, emperors and crown princes began to wear benkan with chains attached to the metal crown, influenced by the Chinese mianguan. Furthermore, a sun-shaped ornament was added to the top of the benkan, giving birth to a uniquely Japanese crown.

Since then, the benkan was worn along with a ceremonial dress called kon'e for accession and chōga (朝賀, New Year's greetings) ceremonies, but it was last worn for the accession ceremony of Emperor Kōmei (1831-1867) in 1847, and has not been worn since.

In addition to benkan for the emperor, there is hōkan (宝冠; lit. 'precious crown') for the female emperor and nikkeikan (日形冠; lit. 'crown in the shape of the sun') for the infant emperor, each of which has a distinctive shape.

The benkan, hōkan, and nikkeikan crowns made in the Edo period (1603-1867) each have survived, but as imperial treasures (御物), these are not usually shown to the public. However, they are occasionally shown to the public to commemorate accession ceremonies.

== Miện quan (Vietnam) ==
The Chinese-style mianguan was also used in Vietnam, where it was known as the miện quan.

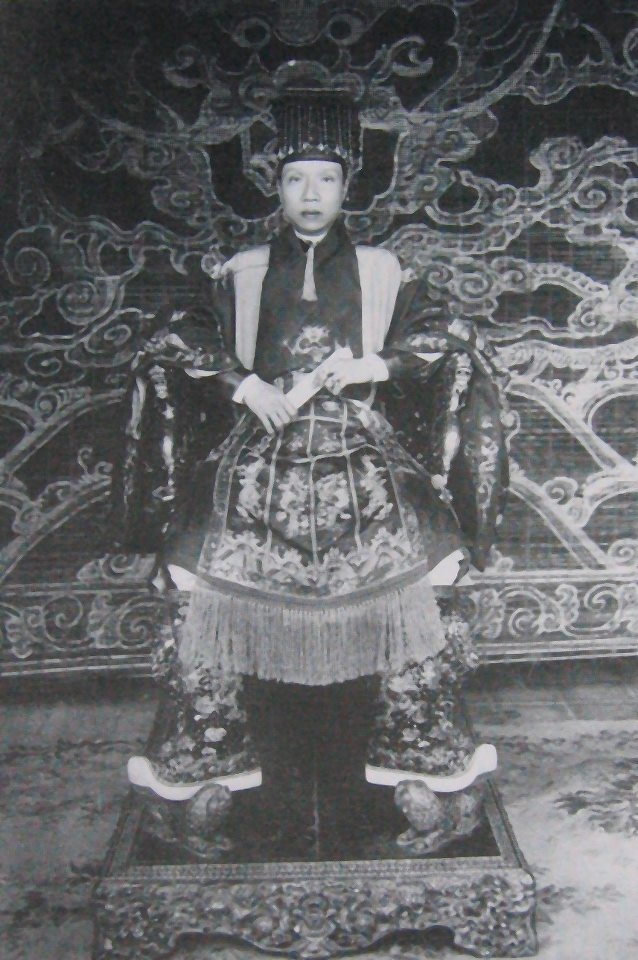
Khải Định of Nguyễn dynasty wearing a garment and miện quan

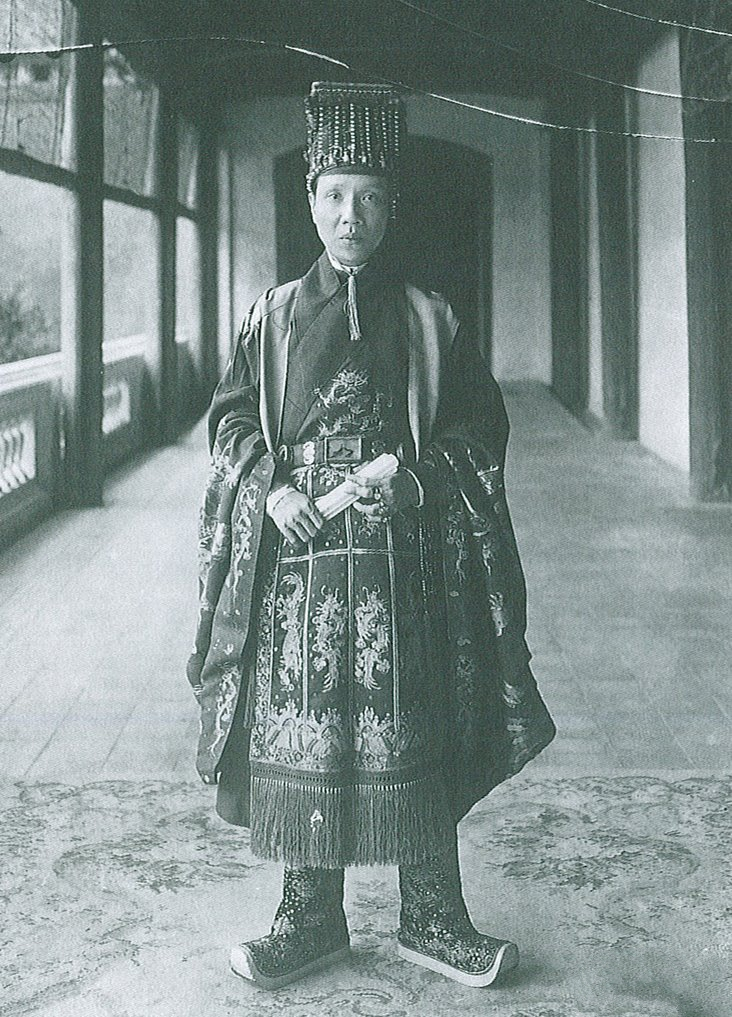
Khải Định of Nguyễn dynasty wearing a miện quan

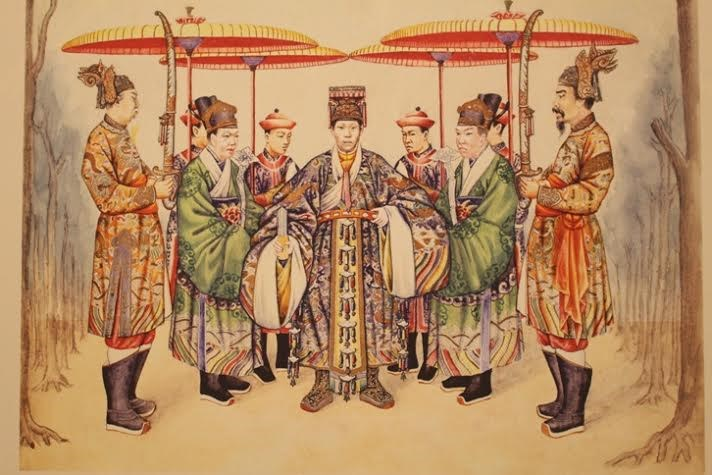
Paintings of Miện quan hats in the Nguyễn dynasty

== Construction and design ==
Mianguan diagram: 1. Extension; 2. Tianhe belt; 3. Cap and roll; 4. chains; 5. Ears; 6. Tail; 7. Wu (武); 8. Jade hairpin

The mianguan is composed of:

A long, rectangular wooden board called the mianguan board (yan in the Han dynasty) was placed on top of the mianguan, with fulls hanging from the front and back of the mianguan board.

In the Han dynasty, the yan was round in the front but flat in the back; it was about 7 inches (180 mm) in width and 1 foot (0.30 m) in length. On both sides of the mianguan, there was a hole where an emerald hairpin could pass through so that the crown could be fastened to the hair bun of its wearer. A red band called the tianhe was attached to the centre of the mianguan and wraps around it. The silk cord was tied on one end of the hairpin and would then be tied on the other side of the hairpin passing under the chin. There was also a chong er (lit. 'stuffing the ear') located on both side of the mianguan around the ear area; the chong er was a pearl or a piece of jade which symbolized that the wearer of mianguan should not believe in any slander.

The number of chains depended on the status of the wearer, and the mianguan of the emperor had 12 chains at the front and back, for a total of 24 chains. The 12 chains dangles down the shoulders and were made of jade beads of multiple colours which would sway with the wearer's movement.

In addition, there was the nine-chained crown, worn by regional lords and the crown prince. The eight-chained crown was worn by other princes and dukes. The qiliu mian (七旒冕, seven-chained crown) was worn by high-ranking ministers. The five-chained crown (wuiu mian, 五旒冕) was worn by viscounts and barons.

The quantity and quality of the jewellery were an important marker of social ranking. In the Han dynasty, the emperor would use 12 strings of white jade, 7 strings of blue jade were used by dukes and princes, and black jade were used for ministers.

Emperor's Twelve-chained crown

Nine-chained crown worn by crown-princes and kings.

Eight-chained crown.

Seven-chained crown.

=== Cultural significance ===
The mianguan was designed to strengthen the charismatic authority of its wearer which was conferred by the head. This is similar to the Mandate of Heaven concept in which there is a rationalization of divine authority.

=== Related items ===
Since China was a crown-wearing culture, there were many crowns for different ranks, positions, and times.

- Feng Guan – a crown worn by an empress (e.g. Phoenix Crown – crowns of Empress Xiao Danxian and Empress Dowager Xiao Jing excavated from the Dingling site, two each)

== See also ==
- Benkan
- Imperial crown
- List of Hanfu headwear

== Bibliography ==
- 閻歩克『服周之冕』中華書局、2009年。
