= Guan (headwear) =

Type of traditional Chinese headwear

- Chinese: 冠
- Literal meaning: Hat/ cap/ crown
Transcriptions
Standard Mandarin
- Hanyu Pinyin: Guān

Guan (Chinese: 冠; pinyin: guān), literally translated as hat or cap or crown in English, is a general term which refers to a type of headwear of Hanfu attire, which covers a small area of the upper part of the head instead of the entire head. The guan was typically a formal form of headwear which was worn together with its corresponding court dress attire. There were sumptuary laws which regulated the wearing of guan; however, these laws were not fixed; and thus, they would differ from dynasty to dynasty. There were various forms and types of guan.

== Cultural significance and symbolism ==
In ancient China, there were various forms of headwear, which included guān (冠; 'crown', 'hat', 'cap'), mao (帽; 'hat/cap'), jin (巾; 'kerchief'), ze (幘; 'turban'), and mian (冕; 'crown').

The code of wearing guan forms a crucial aspect of the Hanfu system. According to philosopher Wang Chong in Lunheng;

"衣服，貨也。如以加之於形爲尊重，在身之物，莫大於冠" ("Clothes fall under commodities. Should they rank higher, for being on the body, then nothing worn on the body is more important than the [guan].")

In ancient China, Han Chinese men had to undergo a capping ceremony called Guan Li as their coming of age ceremony where a guan was placed on their head by a respected elder. The Guan Li started by the nobles of the Zhou dynasty and eventually spread to the civilians. The Guan Li was eventually forcefully ended during the Qing dynasty.

When worn together with fú (服; 'clothes'), a guan can form a set of attire called guānfú (冠服; 'hat and clothes'); this set of attire could be used as an indicator of its wearer's social status, age, occupation, and educational background.

As the character guān (冠; 'crown/hat/cap') is a homonym another Chinese character pronounced guān (官; 'official') which literally means official; the guan (冠) became the symbol of officials.

== History ==
In the early history of guan, sumptuary laws regulated the wearing of guan based on one's social status; as such, the poor people with a low social status were forbidden from the wearing of guan. These laws, however, varied from dynasty to dynasty.

=== Zhou dynasty ===
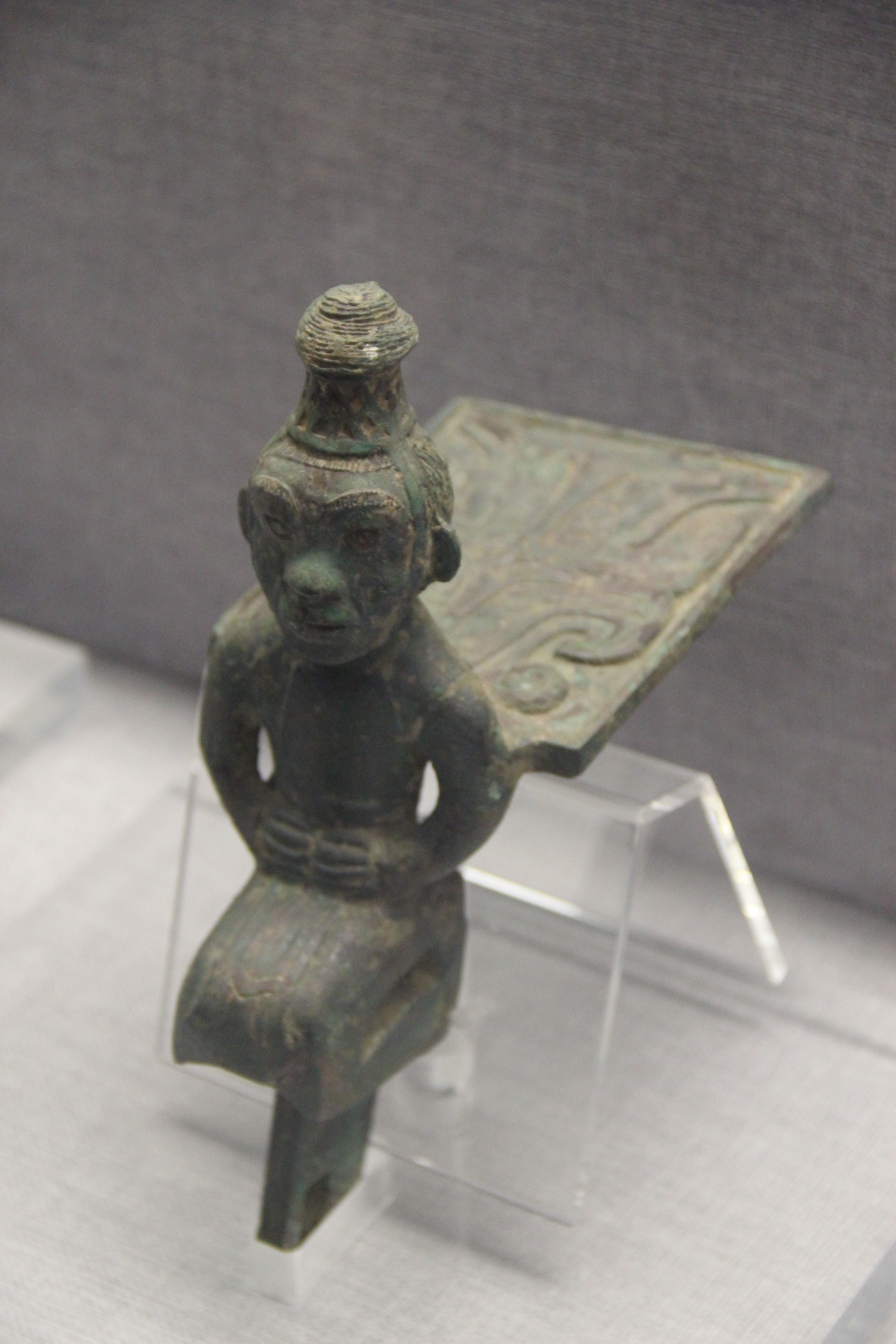
Early form of guan as seen on Western Zhou bronze chariot ornamental figurine

As recorded in Rites of Zhou and Book of Rites, clothing became one of the principles of rites and ceremony, hence guan became a foundational item for etiquette and ritual. During the Zhou dynasty, the main types of guan used were mianguan and bianguan (弁冠). The mianguan was the highest rank of guan and could only be worn by the rulers, the feudal lords and nobles in sacrificial ceremonies, such as the Heaven worshipping ceremony and the ancestors worshipping ceremony, and in conferring ceremony. The mianguan followed strict regulations based on social hierarchy with the number of beads tassels indicating the ranks of its wearer; for example, the Emperor wore twelve beads tassels while the lowest rank officials wore only two beads tassels. The bianguan was the second highest guan after the mianguan and was divided into two types: quebian and pibian. The quebian was red and black in colour. The pibian was decorated with 12 beams of white deer-skin, had an arched top, wide edges, and was decorated with many colourful jades in its seams.

=== Warring States period ===
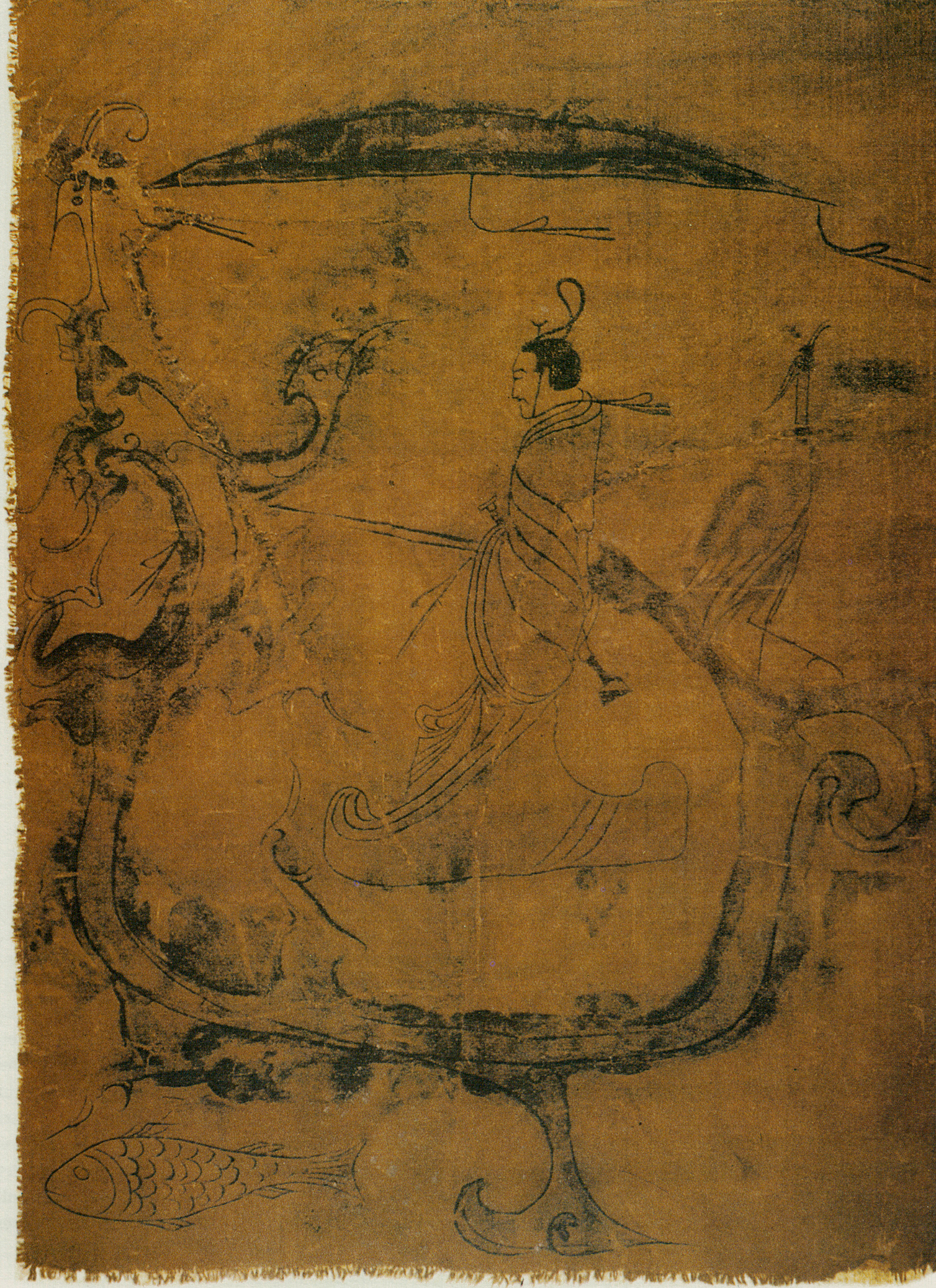
Eastern Zhou silk painting featuring a man wearing shenyi and a guan.

During the Warring States period, King Wuling of Zhao adopted the hufuqishe policy and a hufu-style guan, which looks similar to the conical hat of the Scythians, was adopted. King Wuling's hufu-style guan was less pointy than the actual Scythian hat and he decorated his hat with a marten tail to denote his noble status. The King of Qin later give the hufu-style guan of King Wuling to his servant as an insult to King Wuling after the latter had destroyed the regime of the Zhao state. King Huiwen of Zhao later wore the same hufu-style guan as his father, King Wuling; and therefore this type of guan was named zhàohuìwénguān (趙惠文冠; 'Crown of King Huiwen of Zhao'). Many years later, the zhaohuiwenguan evolved into the military cap called wǔguān (武冠; 'military cap'). (Note: The wuguan (武冠) is often translated as "military cap" in English language literature and sources.)

A wuguan decorated with pheasant feathers became known as héguān ('long-tailed pheasant hat') by the Han dynasty; the heguan was first worn in the state of Zhao to distinguish military officers during the Warring States period. The heguan was possibly derived from the hufu-style guan adopted by King Wuling through hufuqishe policy. The snow pheasant (鶡; hé) was a symboll of martial valour and courage, since snow pheasants would fight their opponents until death.

=== Qin dynasty ===
In the Qin dynasty, the heguan continued to be worn to distinguish military officers; by that time onward, the use of heguan had spread throughout the whole empire.

=== Han dynasty ===
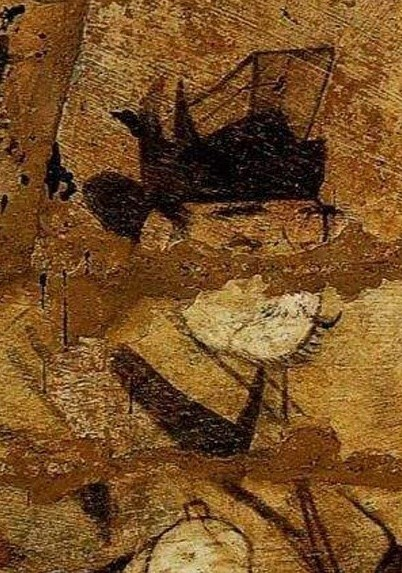
Jinxianguan, Han dynasty

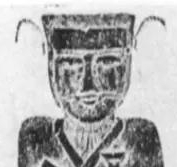
Wuguan, Han dynasty

In the Han dynasty, only people from distinguished background were allowed to wear guan. During this period, there were many forms of guan, such as tongtianguan worn by the Emperor, yuanyouguan worn by dukes and princes; jinxianguan worn by the civil officials, and wuguan (武冠) worn by the military officials. The heguan was decorated with two pheasant feathers on either sides and was worn by specialized member of the Han dynasty military.

=== Sui dynasty ===
Emperor Wendi of Sui established a new attire system by basing himself on the system of the Cao Wei, Western Jin, and Northern Qi dynasties; however the Sui dynasty system was incomplete. It was under Emperor Yangdi that more reforms took place in accordance with the ancient traditions and that the appearance of the ritual headwear were reformed.

The mianguan continued to be worn by the Emperor Yangdi. He also wore bianguan (弁冠) which was distinguished by a gold mountain-symbol called boshan (博山). He also wore another kind of guan called wubian (武弁), which was lighter and simpler in terms of designs when compared to the mianguan. The wubian was traditionally worn by the military officials, and it was derived from the bianguan which was worn by the court officials. The wubian became the favourite guan of the Emperor Yangdi when he went on cuttings; such as hunting trips, military expeditions, and other related ceremonies. He also allowed his ministers and the other government officials (military and civil officials) to wear the wubian.

The jinxianguan (進賢冠) was worn by the civil officials at the court. The court censors wore the quefeiguan (卻非冠) under the reign of Emperor Wendi as their official headgear, but it was later replaced by the xiezhiguan (獬豸冠) by Emperor Yangdi which would distinguish its wearer's rank through the use of various materials. (Note: Materials which were used to make the Sui dynasty's xiezhiguan were gold or rhinoceros horns or antelope horn.)

=== Tang dynasty ===
In the Tang dynasty, the guan was replaced by the futou in the official clothing system.

=== Song dynasty ===
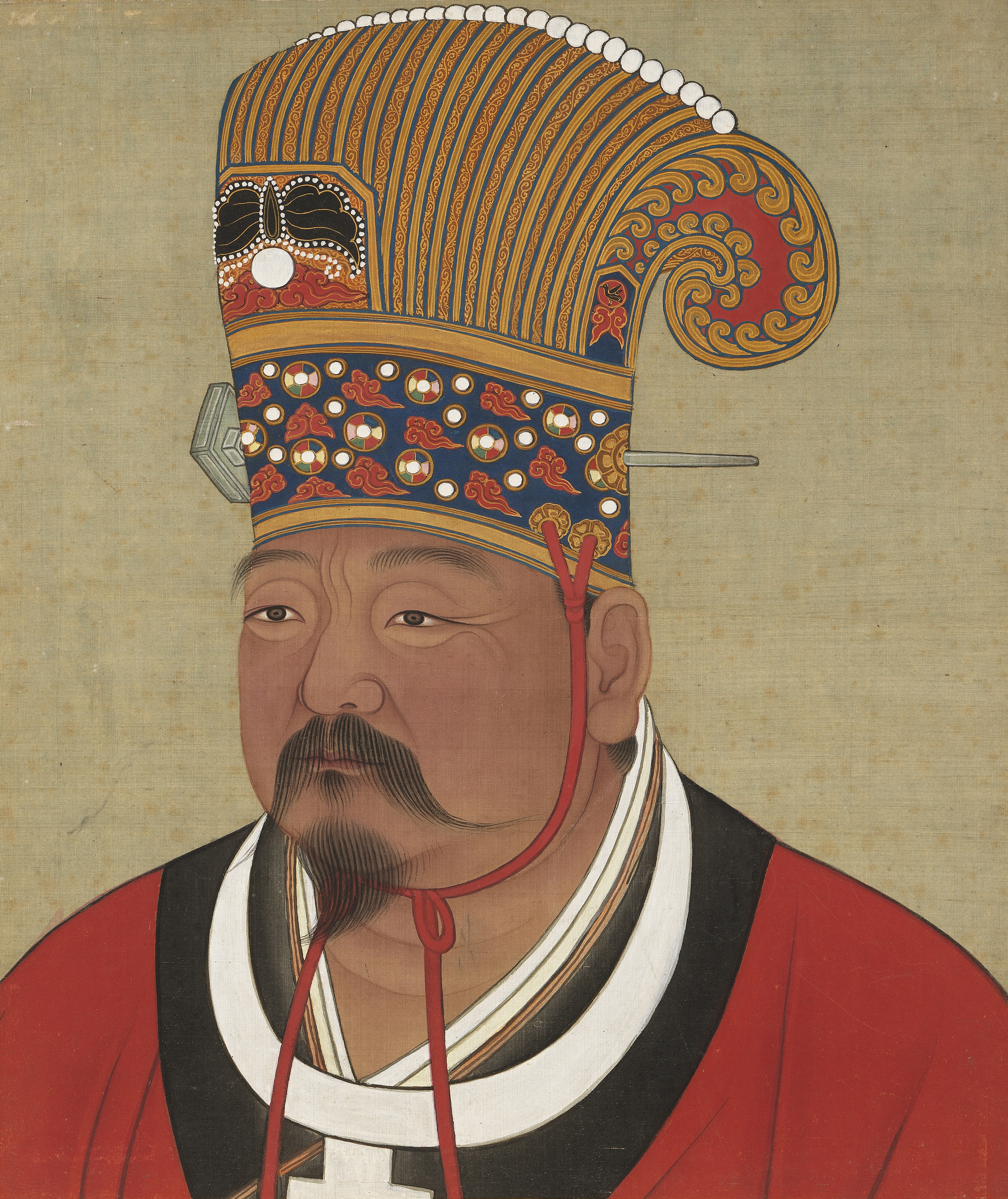
Song Dynasty emperor's tongtianguan

In the Song dynasty, the Emperor wore the tongtianguan while the crown prince wore yuanyouguan (遠遊冠). The guan was worn by the literati which continued the long tradition. It was also generally worn by the junzi and those who were dedicated to adhere to the ancient courtesies and etiquette. Some literati would also wear the xiaoguan (小冠; 'small crown') on summer days in order to not expose their topknot. Under the reign of Emperor Huizong, all Confucian temples were ordered to upgrade their images of Confucius by adding a mianguan with 12 beaded-tassels on its depictions.

=== Ming dynasty ===
In the Ming dynasty, the guan was only reserved to the Emperor and the members of the royal family; they were only suitable on formal occasions. The emperor wore yishanguan (翼善冠). (Note: The yishanguan of the Ming dynasty is also a kind of futou)

== Types of historical guan ==
- Diaochanguan (貂蟬冠) / longjin (笼巾; 'cage kerchief')
- Fengguan
- Heguan (鶡冠) – a military guan decorated with pheasant feathers.
- Jinxianguan (进贤冠; 進賢冠)
- Mianguan
- Bianguan (弁冠): Pibian and quebian
- Quefeiguan (卻非冠; 'the cap that rejects the wrong')
- Shufaguan (束发冠) – a type of xiaoguan
- Tongtianguan/ chengtianguan (lit. 'a hat bearing the sky')
- Wuguan (武冠; 'military cap')/ daguan (大冠)/ wubiandaguan (武弁大冠) – wuguan was derived from the zhaohuiwenguan
- Xiaoguan (小冠; 'small crown')
- Xiezhiguan (獬豸冠; 'Xiezhi crown')/ faguan (法冠; 'Legal crown')
- Yishanguan (翼善冠)
- Yuanyouguan (遠遊冠)
- Zhaohuiwenguan (趙惠文冠)

== Gallery ==
Types of historical guan

Daoguan (道冠)

Faguan (法冠)

Fangshanguan (方山冠)

Fankuaiguan (樊噲冠)

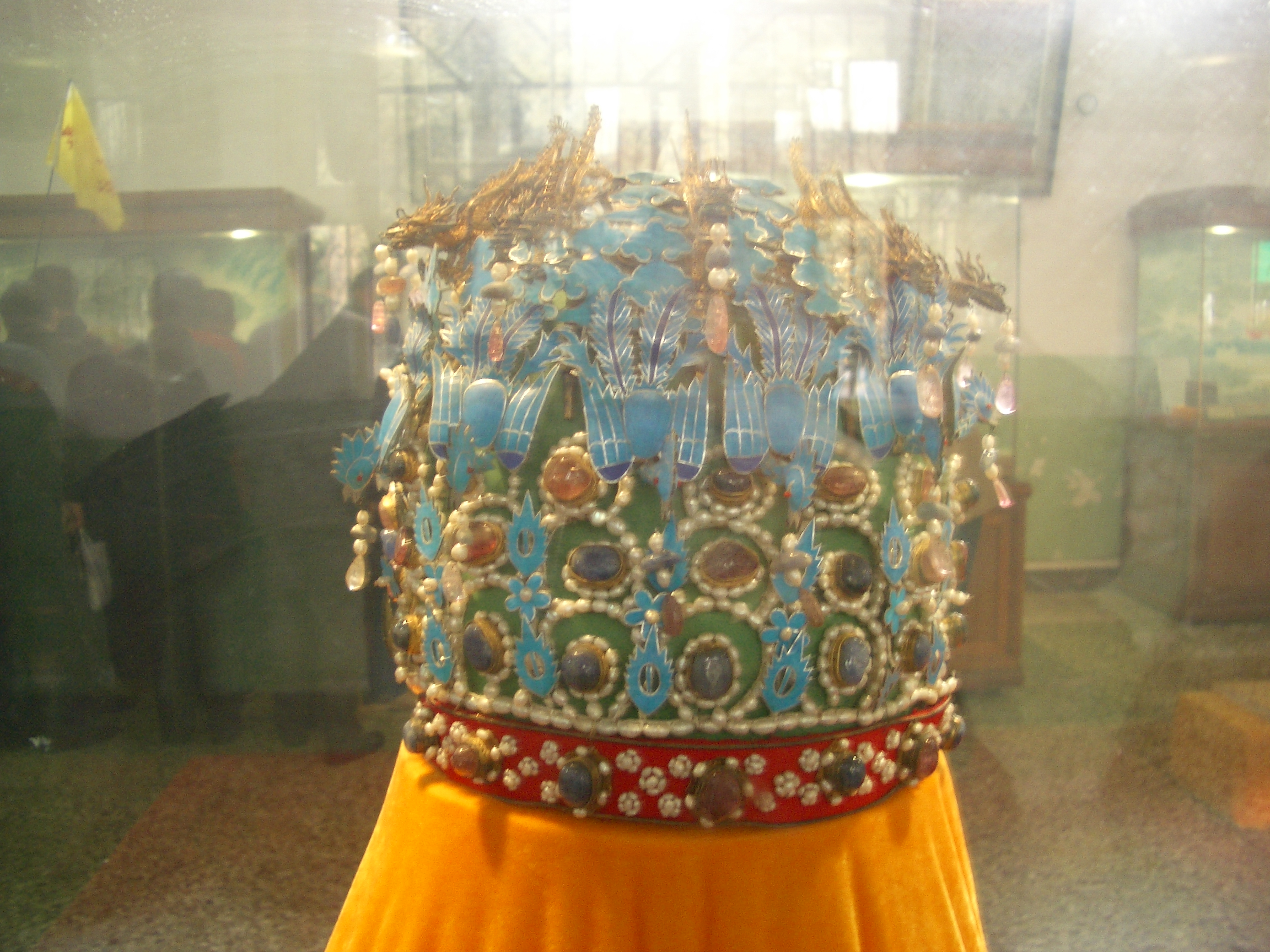
Fengguan can be worn in diyi and fengguan xiapei

Gaoshanguan (高山冠)

Jianhuaguan (建華冠)

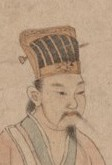
Liangguan (梁冠) or Jinxianguan (進賢冠)

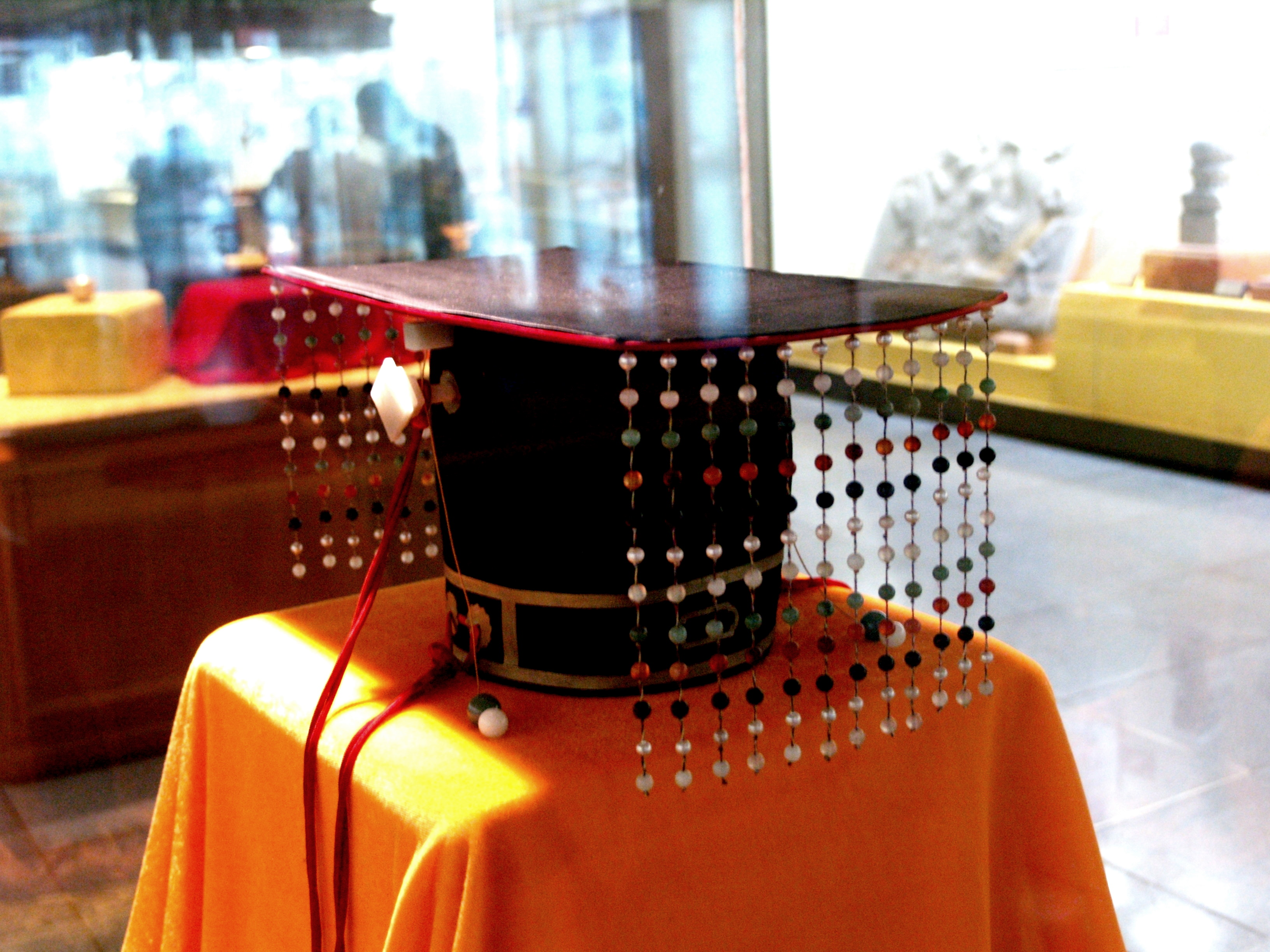
Mianguan worn in mianfu

Pibianguan (皮弁冠) worn in pienfu

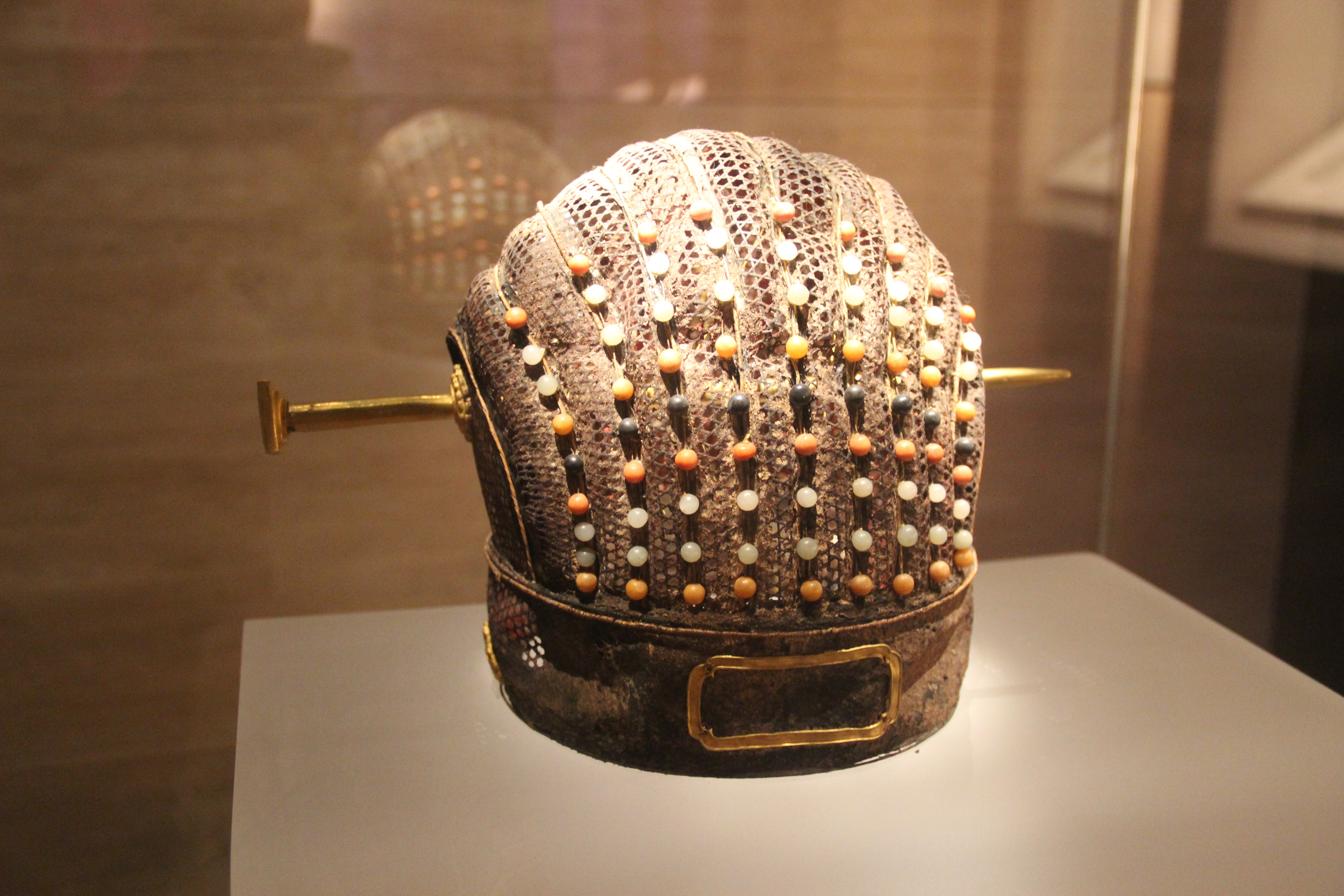
Pibianguan (皮弁冠) of Prince Huang of Lu, housed in Shandong Museum

Qiaoshiguan (巧士冠)

Quediguan (卻敵冠)

Quefeiguan (卻非冠)

Shushiguan (術士冠)

Tongtianguan (通天冠) worn in tongtianguanfu

Tongtianguan (通天冠) worn in tongtianguanfu

Wubiandaguan (武弁大冠)

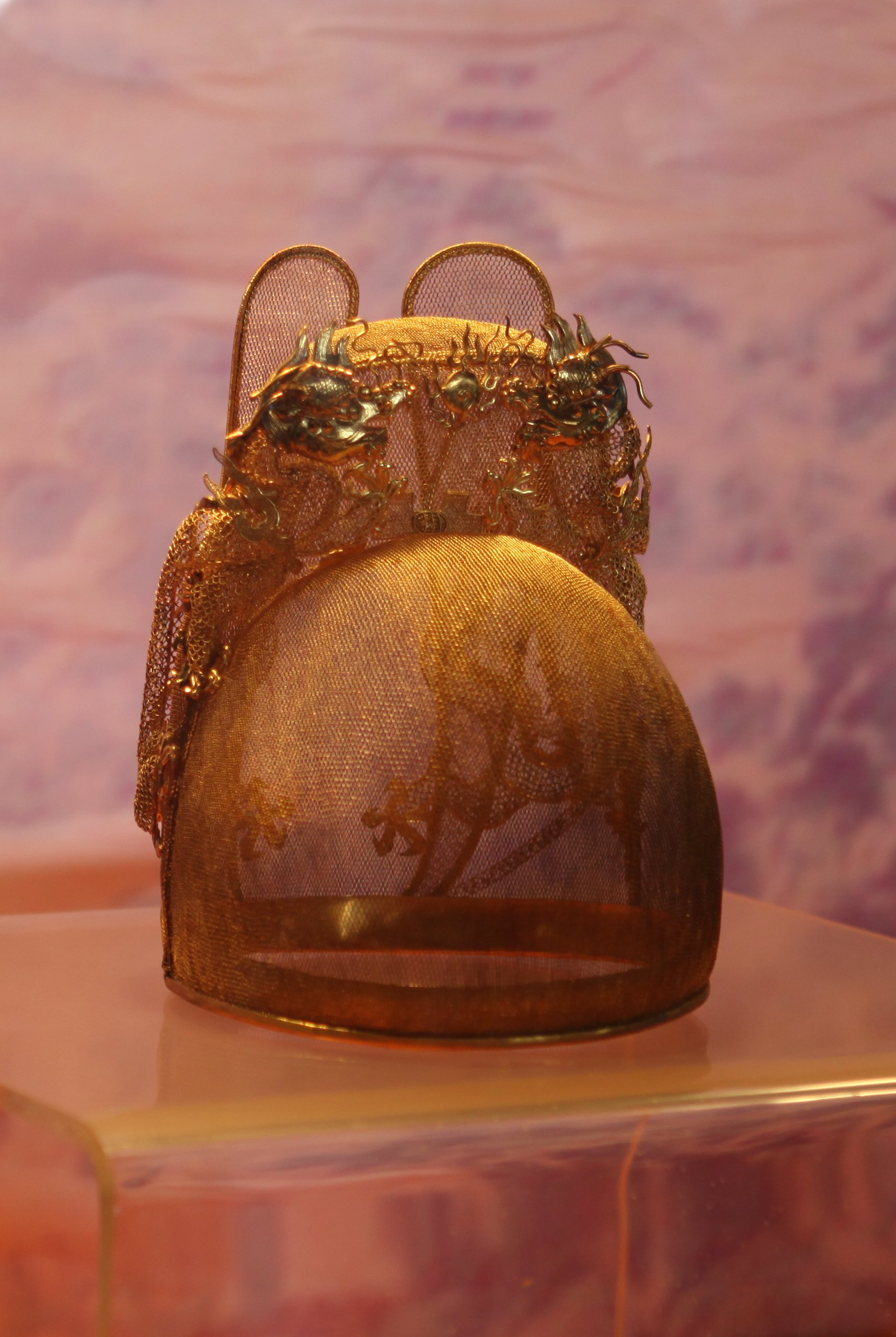
Yishanguan (翼善冠), Ming dynasty

Yuanyouguan (遠遊冠)

Zhangfuguan (章甫冠)

Zhangguan (長冠)

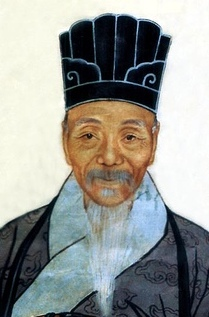
Zhongjingguan (忠靖冠)

== See also ==
- Guan Li
- Hanfu
- List of Hanfu headwear
