= Tongtianguanfu =

Court attire worn by emperors of China

- Emperor Xuanzu (宣祖) of Song wearing tongtianguanfu.
- Chinese: 通天冠服
- Literal meaning: 'Direct links with Heaven' uniform
Transcriptions
Standard Mandarin
- Hanyu Pinyin: Tōngtiān guānfú

Tongtianguanfu (Chinese: 通天冠服) is a form of hanfu court attire which was worn by the emperor during the Song dynasty on very important occasions, such as grand court sessions and during major title-granting ceremonies. The attire traces its origin from the Han dynasty.It was also worn in the Jin dynasty emperors when the apparel system of the Song dynasty was imitated and formed their own carriages and apparel system, and in the Ming dynasty. The tongtianguanfu was composed of a red outer robe, a white inner robe, a bixi, and a guan called tongtianguan, and a neck accessory called fangxin quling.

== Terminology ==
The term tongtian means "direct links with heaven".

== Composition and construction ==
The tongtianguanfu is composed of:

The gauze outer robe (paofu), called jiangshapao (绛纱袍). It was crimson in colour with patterns of clouds and dragons embroidery which was gold and red in colours. There were black borders stitched to the collar, sleeves, lapels and hems of the crimson outer robe.

The crimson outer robe was worn with a red gauze skirt and a crimson bixi (蔽膝; "knee cover") was fastened around the waist of its wearer. The inner garment was a white robe (白纱中单).

The high crown was called tongtianguan (通天冠; 'a hat accessing the sky'), which was also known as chengtianguan ('a hat bearing the sky'). The tongtianguan was exclusively worn by the Emperor during some grand ceremonies. The high crown was originally nine cun tall and tilting towards the back to form a "rolling shape" made by metal beams, with a "mountain"-shape and zhantong (展筒) on the front, and pinned on the hair with hairpins made of jade or rhinoceros horn. By the Jin dynasty, the tongtianguan added a golden mountain-shaped plaque ornament (珰; dāng) on the front, and by the Tang dynasty, tongtianguan of the Emperor had 24 beams.

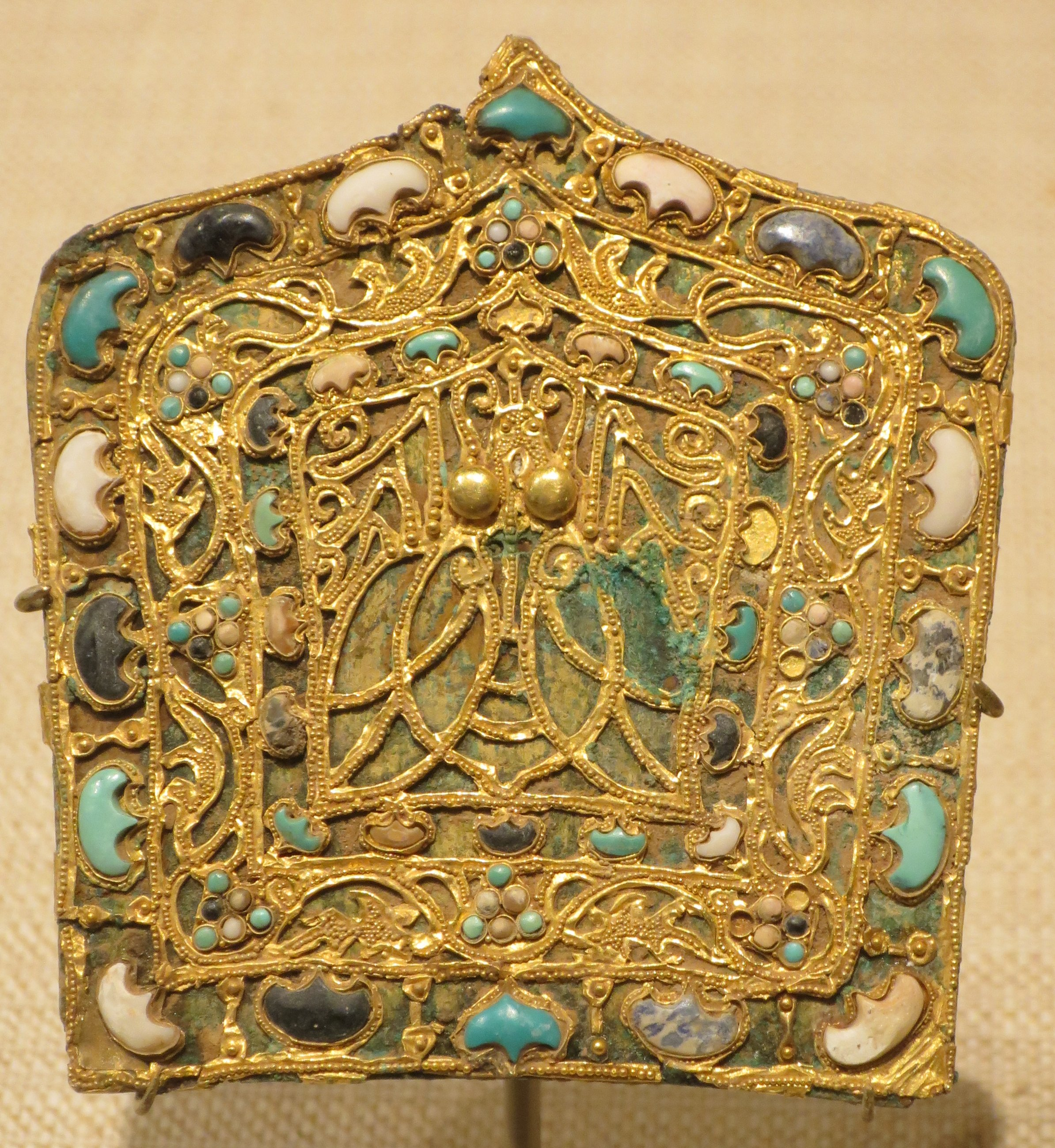
Eastern Jin dynasty cicada dāng plaque ornament used on official headwear.

A pendant-like ornament called fangxin quling (方心曲领; 'bent collar with a square center') was hung around the neck. The fangxin quling was a notable feature in the ceremonial court attire of the Song and Ming dynasties. It was made out of silk and was cut into a circle (which hung around the neck and shoulder areas) and a square (either solid or open square) which would fall over the cross-collared lapels of the paofu. The shape of the circle and square symbolized the Heaven and earth respectively.

A belt with ribbons was also tied to the waist.

As footwear, the Emperor would have worn white stockings and black shoes.

Tongtianguan (通天冠) from the Gujin Tushu Jicheng.

Crimson robe (絳紗袍) from the Gujin Tushu Jicheng.

Fangxin quling (方心曲領) from the Gujin Tushu Jicheng.

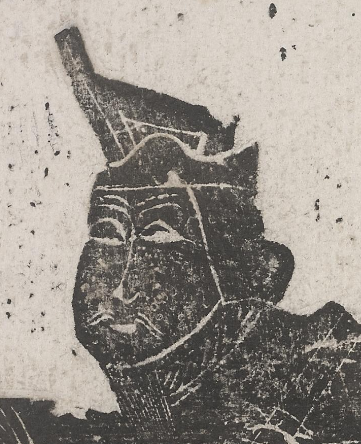
Han dynasty tongtianguan seen on the Wu Family Shrines stone-relief (worn by King Xuan of Qi).

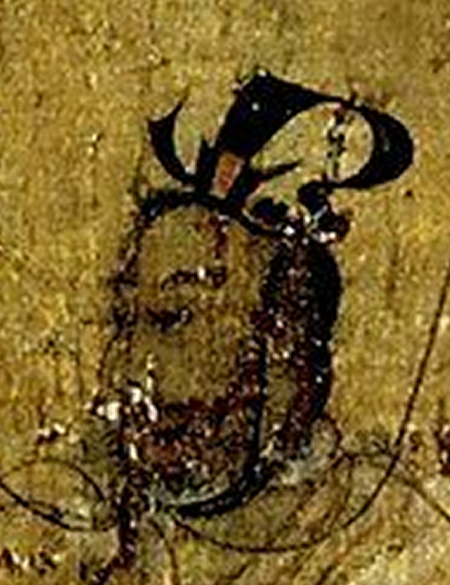
Jin dynasty tongtianguan seen on the Admonitions Scroll by Gu Kaizhi (worn by Emperor Yuan of Han).

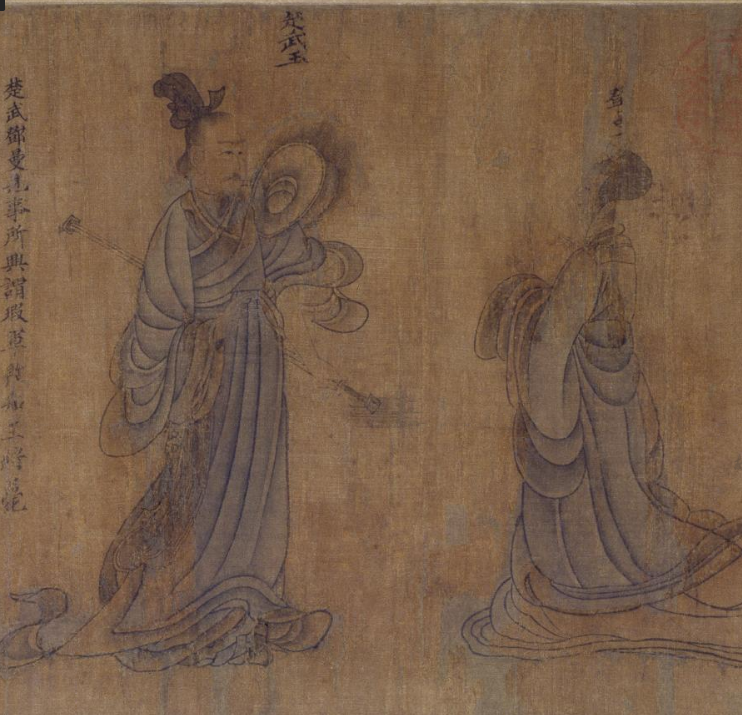
Jin dynasty tongtianguan seen on a segment of Wise and Benevolent Women-scroll painting by Gu Kaizhi (on the left; worn by King Wu of Chu).

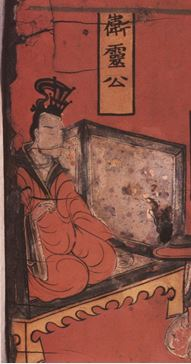
Northern Wei dynasty lacquer painting of Duke Ling of Wey wearing a tongtianguan.

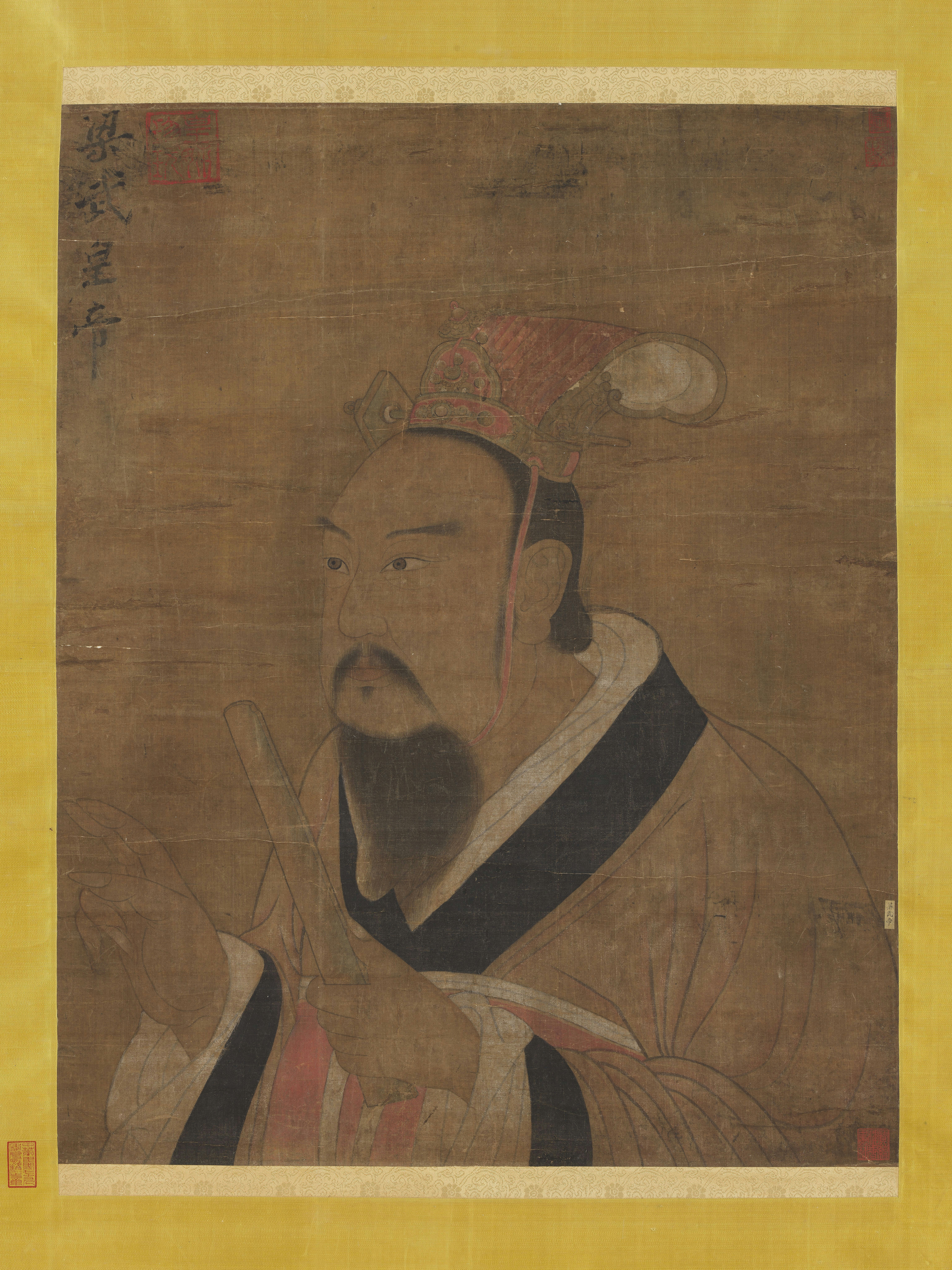
Portrait of Emperor Wu of Liang wearing a tongtianguan

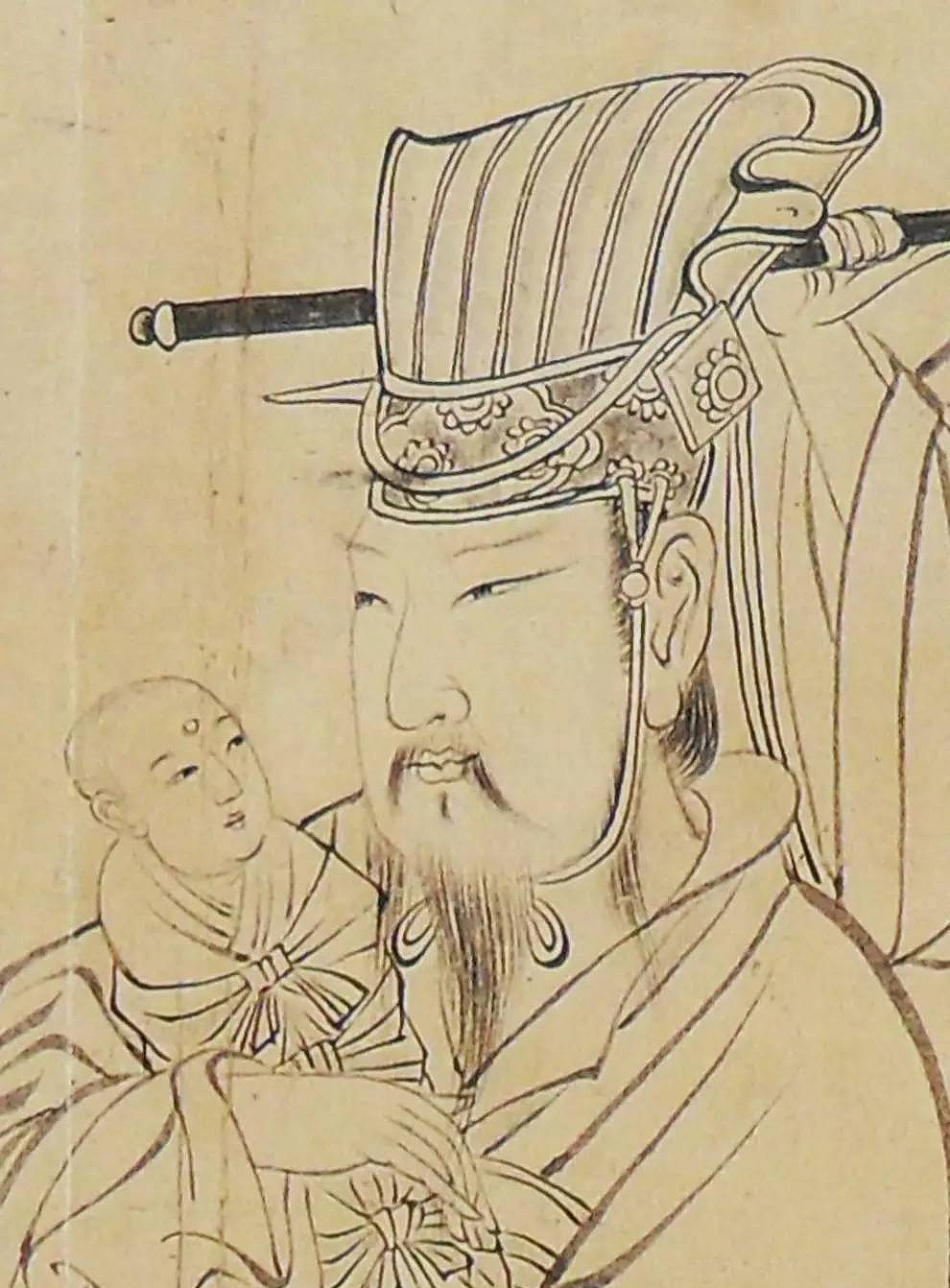
Tang dynasty tongtianguan as depicted on Wu Daozi's scroll-painting.

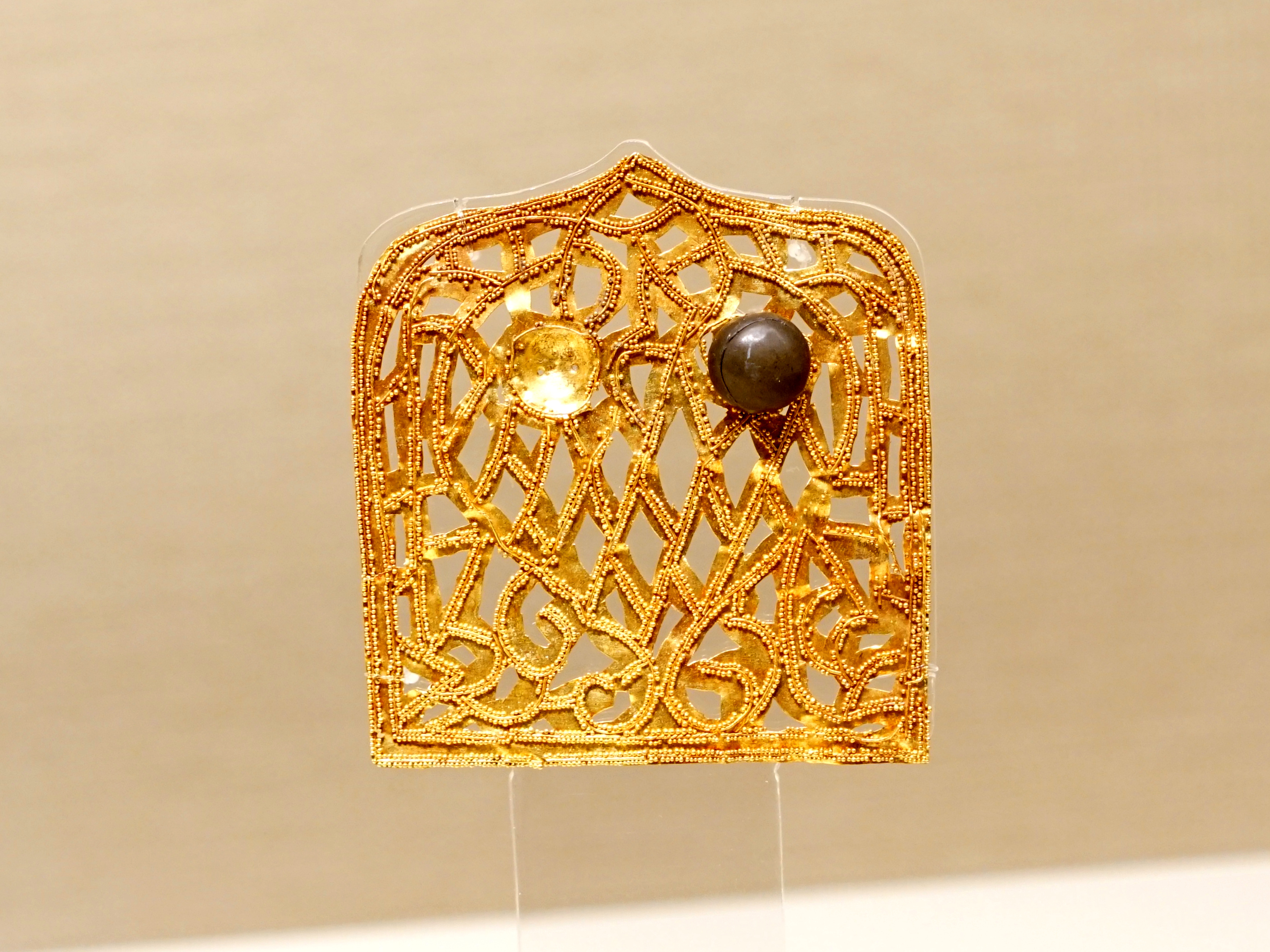
Northern Yan golden cicada-patterned dang plaque ornament, used on headwear such as the tongtianguan.

== See also ==
- Hanfu
- List of Hanfu
