= Fashion in the Yuan dynasty =

Yuan dynasty fashion

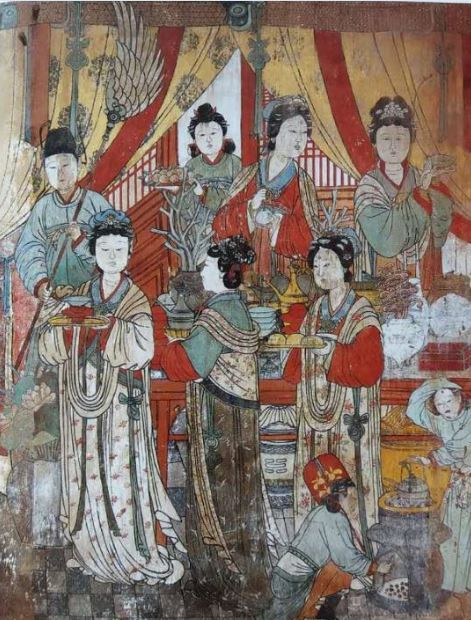
Fresco in the Hall of King Ming-ying, Hung-t'ung County

The fashion in the Yuan dynasty of Mongol (1271–1368) showed cultural diversity with the coexistence of various ethnic clothing, such as Mongol clothing, Han clothing and Korean clothing. The Mongol dress was the clothing of elite for both genders. Mongol attire worn in the 13th-14th century was different from the Han clothing from the Tang and Song dynasties. The Yuan dynasty court clothing also allowed the mixed of Mongol and Han style, and the official dress code of the Yuan dynasty also became a mixture of Han and Mongol clothing styles. After the founding of the Yuan dynasty, the Mongols strongly influenced the lifestyle and customs of the Han people.

According to the History of Yuan, "when the Yuan Dynasty was founded, clothing and carriage decorations followed the old customs. Kublai Khan took the customs from the Jin and Song Dynasty to the Han and Tang Dynasty". The casual clothing for men mainly followed the dress code of the Han people and they wore banbi as a casual clothing item. Women dress code were separated into the aristocratic type (which was Mongol clothing) and the common people type (which were Han clothing consisting of ruqun and banbi).

== History ==
=== Pre-Yuan dynasty ===
Li Zhichang noted in his 1221 visit to Genghis Khan court that the Mongol clothing were made of "hides and fur". In the Heida shilüe:

[The Mongols'] robes close to the right and have square collars. In the past they used felt, furs, and leather; nowadays they use ramie, silk, and gold thread. As for colours they use red, purple, violet, and green, and for patterns the sun, moon, dragon, and phoenix. They do not distinguish between upper and lower classes [in their dress]. (Note: The recorded observations on Mongol clothing found in Heida shilüe were based on the observations of the Southern Song envoys Peng Daya who visited the Mongol court in 1232 and Xu Ting who visited the Mongol court between 1235 and 1236.)

=== Yuan dynasty ===
Following the establishment of the Yuan dynasty, the Mongols had a profound impact on the lifestyle and customs of the Han people. According to the History of Yuan, "[W]hen the Yuan Dynasty was founded, clothing and carriage decorations followed the old customs. Kublai Khan took the customs from the Jin and Song dynasty to the Han and Tang dynasty." The clothing system of the Yuan dynasty was first codified in under the reign of Temür Khan. It was only under the reign of Ayurbarwada Buyantu Khan (d. 1320) that sumptuary laws regulated the use of textiles, materials, and patterns instead of regulating the form of clothing.

== Textile and colour ==
=== Textile ===
Prior to the establishment of Yuan dynasty, the Mongols wore clothing made of animal-based raw materials, such as leather, felt, and fur. Following the establishment of the Yuan dynasty, the Mongols started to wear finer materials, such as plant-based textiles and silk.

=== Colour ===
Among the Yuan aristocracy, the clothing were distinguished by various of colour, for example, the colour brown had more than 20 different shades of brown.

== Mongol Clothing ==
=== Men's clothing ===
==== Dragon robes ====
During this period, the Mongols were also strongly influenced by the lifestyle and customs of the Hans, including in their adoption of fenghuang and dragon pattern (motifs which are of Han origins). Some of the patterns contained gold glittering thread which made the clothing look more luxurious.

==== Terlig and jisun ====
The Mongol attire was shared by people of different social ranking due to its practicality which contrasted with the dress code of the Han Chinese; as such, Mongol attire was popular. An important and popular robe for male Mongols was the terlig, known as bianxian ao (辫线袄; plait-line coat) or yaoxian ao (腰线袄; waist-thread coat); this coat had decorations at the waist, tight sleeves, and pleats at the lower hem which made it convenient for horse riding and was worn by all social classes.

The most notable terlig is the jisün garment, known as zhisunfu (质孙服) in Chinese. The jisün garment was one of the most important male court garment of the Yuan dynasty; it was worn by the emperors and bestowed from the emperors to officials; it can also be called zhisun (质孙 or 只孙), jixun (济逊), or zhama (诈玛). The original jisün was worn by the Mongols prior to the establishment of the Yuan dynasty, but it became more elaborate and systematic in the Yuan dynasty. In the History of Yuan, the jisün is also described as yisefu (一色服, dress in one colour) and were usually found in one colour.

==== Haiqing ====
Another distinctive form of male Mongol Yuan court robe is a robe with underarm openings, which is referred as "all- weather" robe by Zhao Feng or Haiqing (海青) in post-Yuan dynasty texts. (Note: The Mongol Haiqing should not be confused with the Chinese Haiqing, another kind of robe worn by Buddhist monks.) The robe has long sleeves and the underarm opening is on the seam which joins the sleeves to the body of the robe.

This form of robe is portrayed in the painting Khubilai Khan Hunting by Liu Guandao; in the painting, the Haiqing worn by some of the male attendants or hunters and by Empress Chabi. The functionality of the underarm openings is not completely clear, but it might have been related to the weather as slipping the arms through the underarms openings could create a sleeveless robe. The wearer could also slipped out his arm out of the underarm openings to allow for a greater ease of movement as depicted by an archer in green Haiqing in the painting Khubilai Khan Hunting.

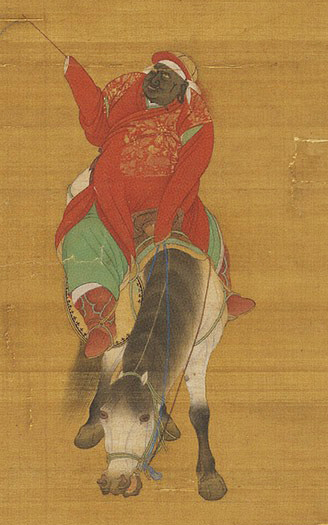
Man wearing a red Mongol robe with underarm openings. The green under-robe is visible under the red Haiqing. Images from the painting Khubilai Khan Hunting.

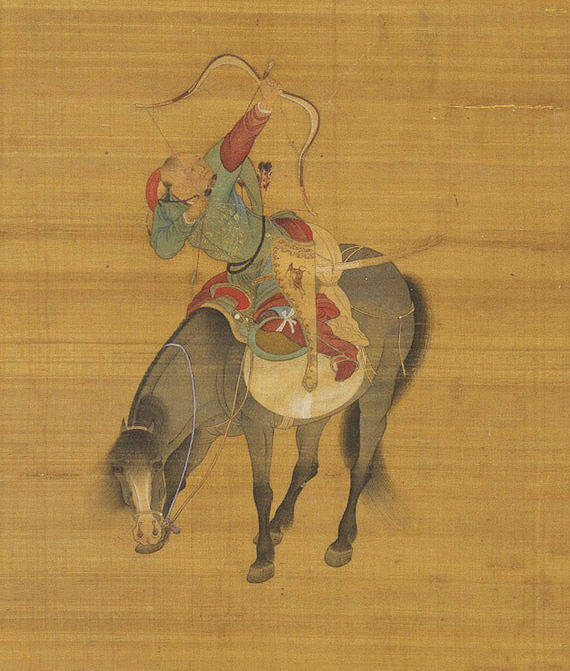
Male attendant wearing a Mongol robe with underarm openings (Haiqing). His left arm passes through the underarms opening, making the left side sleeveless. Images from the painting Khubilai Khan Hunting.

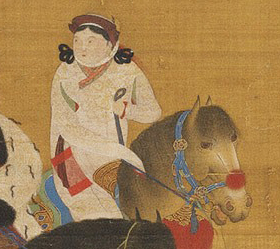
Empress Chabi wearing white Haiqing. Images from the painting Khubilai Khan Hunting.

==== Dahu / Short-sleeved outer robes ====
There were various types of banbi in the Yuan dynasty: straight collar short shan with half-sleeves (直领短衫), a half-sleeved long robe (changpao 长袍) with a cross-collar closing to the right (jiaoling youren 交领右衽), which is specifically called dahu), and square-collar long robe (方领对襟长袍) with half-sleeves. Following pre-Yuan dynasty fashion, the Mongols often wore short-sleeved outer robes (dahu) over their long-sleeved robes.

Dahu was also introduced in the late Goryeo from the Yuan dynasty where it became known as dapho. A derivative of the Mongol dahu of the same name continued to be worn in the succeeding Ming dynasty; the Ming dynasty dahu was also bestowed to the Joseon court. (Note: The translated English version of the source wrote 'dopo'; however dopo is another kind of robe. The Korean version links to the page 'dapo'. Dapo is another way of writing the term 'dapho'.) Similar forms of short-sleeved robes worn over outer robes can also be found in artwork and illustrations of the Ilkhanate and in other countries in the later centuries.

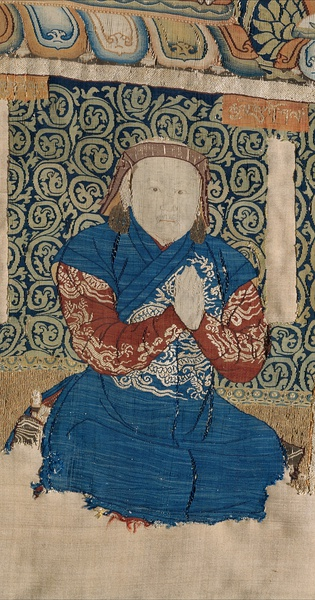
Khutughtu Khan, Yuan dynasty, ca. 1330–32.

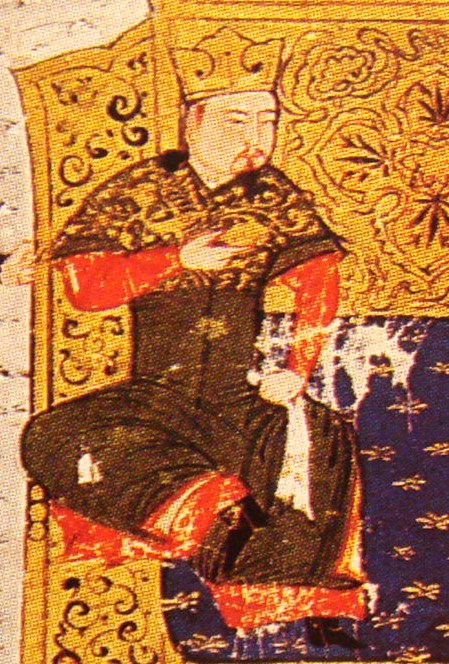
Tolui Khan, by Rashid-al-Din Hamadani.

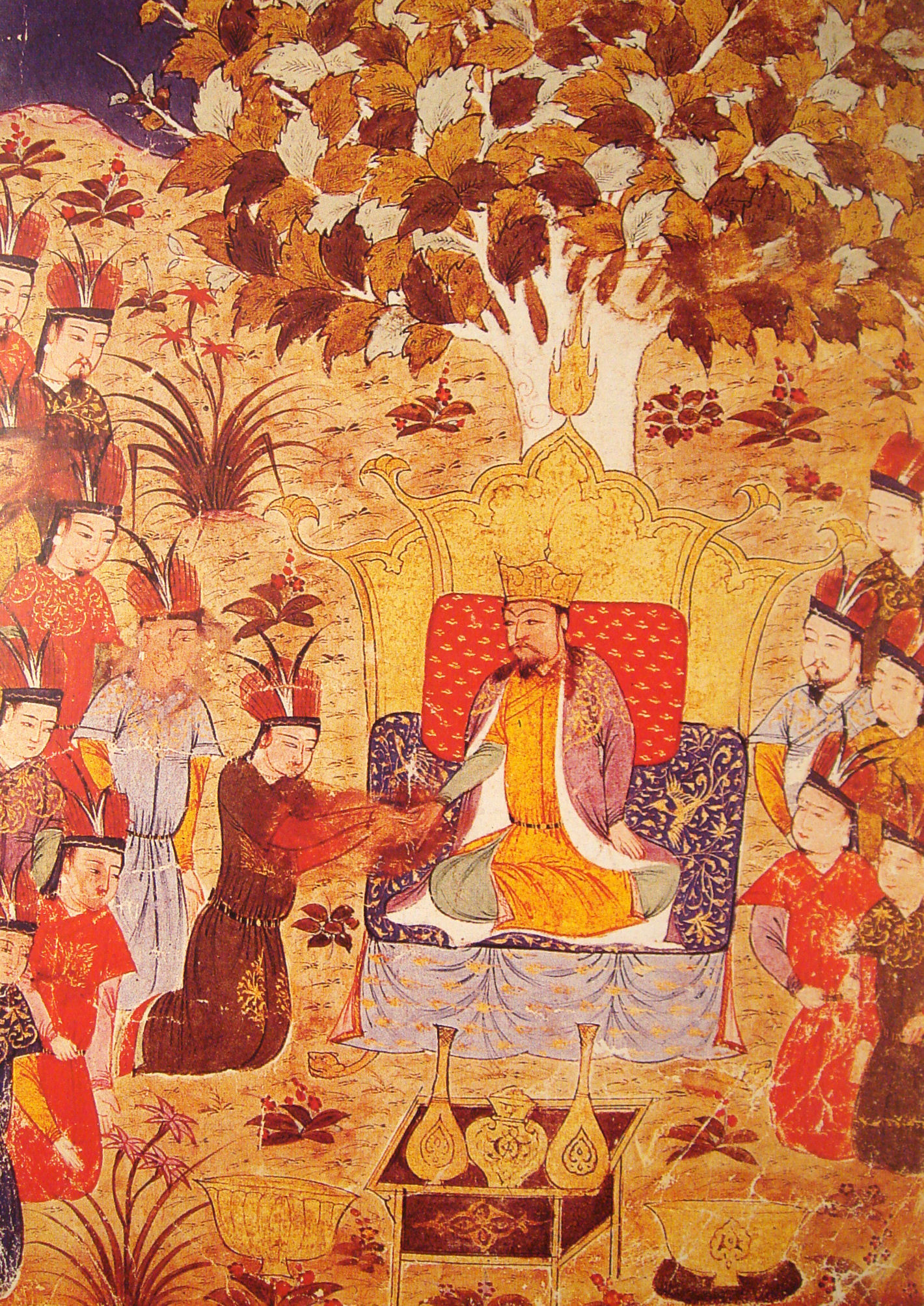
Coronation of Ogodei in 1229, by Rashid al-Din, early 14th century

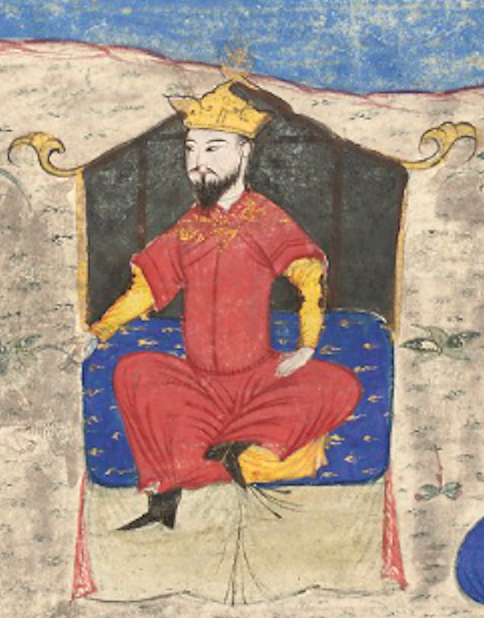
Alp Arslan on throne Majma al-Tawarikh by Hafiz-i Abru, circa 1425.

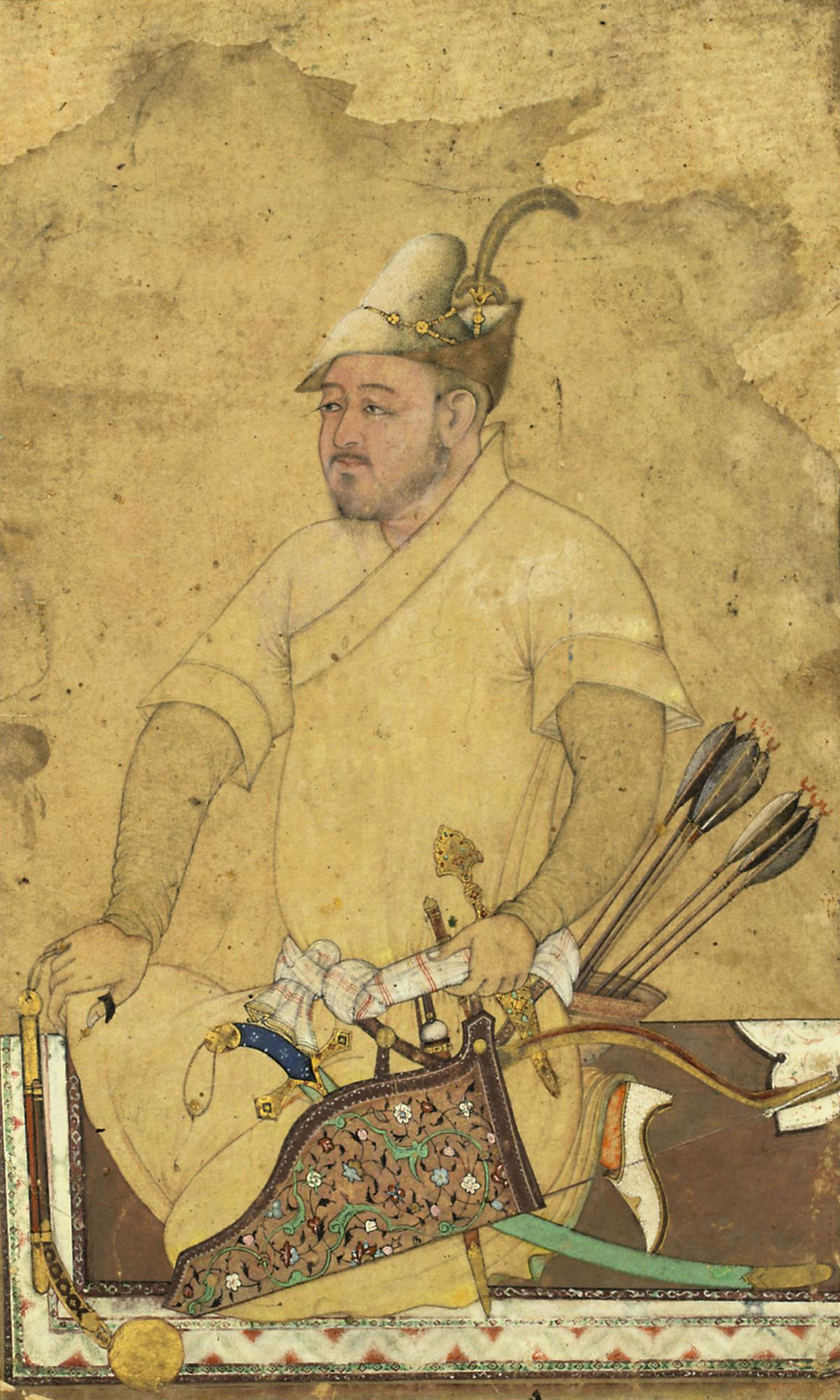
A heavily armed Uzbek, Safavid Iran, mid 16th century

==== Bijia ====
Mongol men also wore a sleeveless and collarless garment like a vest, called bijia (比甲), whose making was attributed to Empress Chabi. The bijia was convenient for mounted combat.

==== Hairstyle and headware ====
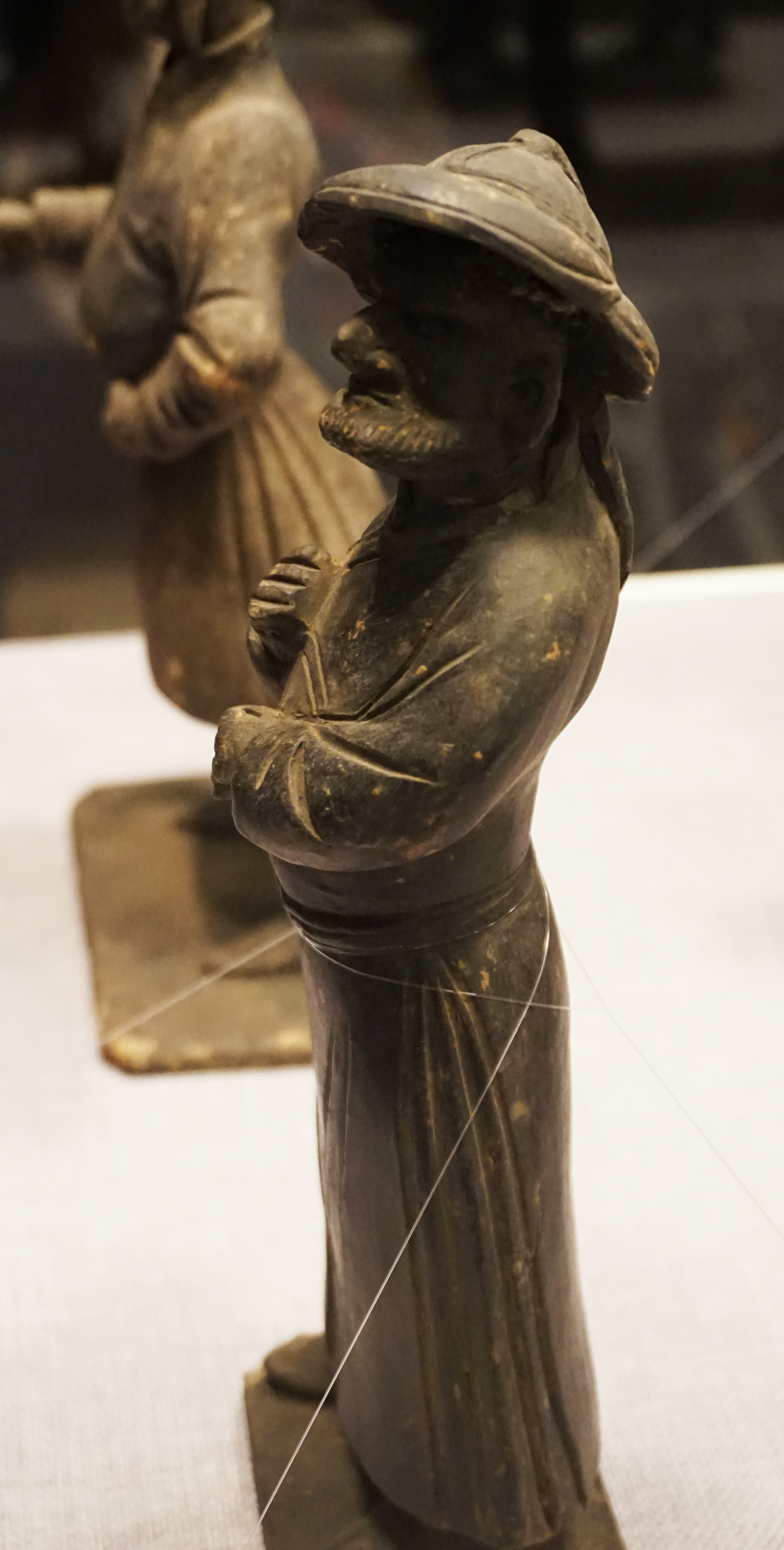
Figurine wearing a boli hat, Yuan dynasty.

Mongol men swept their hair into two plaits and would hang them behind their ears in a style called pojiao (婆焦).

Mongol men wore round or square hats which were made of rattan; and these hats could be surmounted with an ornament. Triangular hats, called maoli, were also worn by Mongol men. Felt hats with upturned brim was the most common form of hat which are typically depicted in the portraits of Genghis Khan, Ögedei Khan, and Kublai Khan.

Mongolian hats were traditionally brimless at the front which offered no protection against the sun. The boli hat (钹笠帽; boli mao) was a popular hat which was worn by the Mongols in Yuan dynasty as it had a wide brim which made it sun-proof and rain-proof; it was worn by emperors, officials and male commoners. The creation of the Mongol hat with a wide brim has been attributed to Empress Chabi. Kublai Khan was delighted with the hat invented by Empress Chabi that he decreed for this type of hat to be popularized. The later Yuan emperors are depicted wearing the boli hats instead of the traditional hats worn in the official portrait of Kublai Khan.

==== Ornaments and jewelries ====
Mongol men often wore earrings.

Mongol men clothing

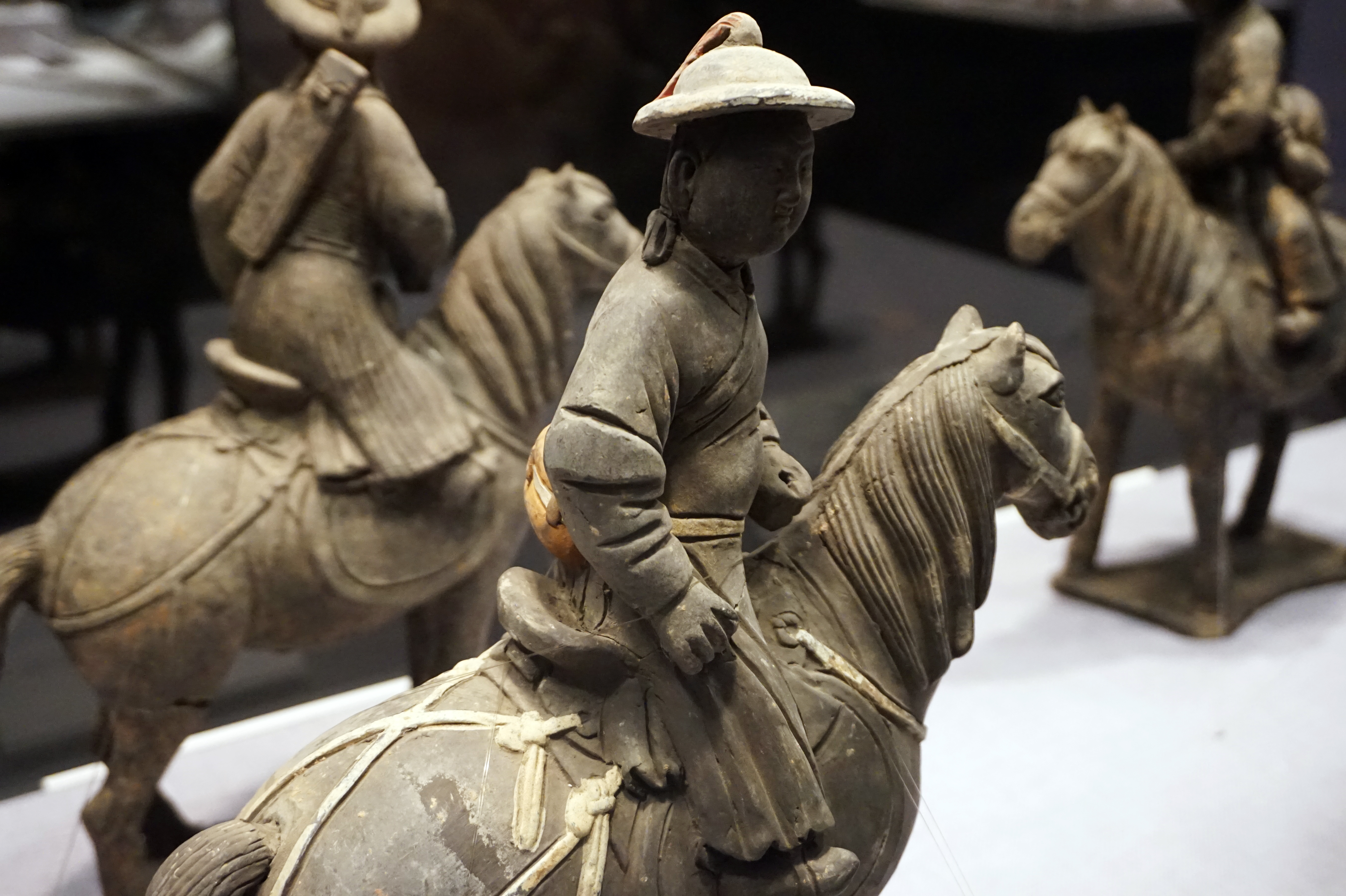
Figure of a Mongol man wearing Mongol attire and a boli hat, Yuan dynasty.

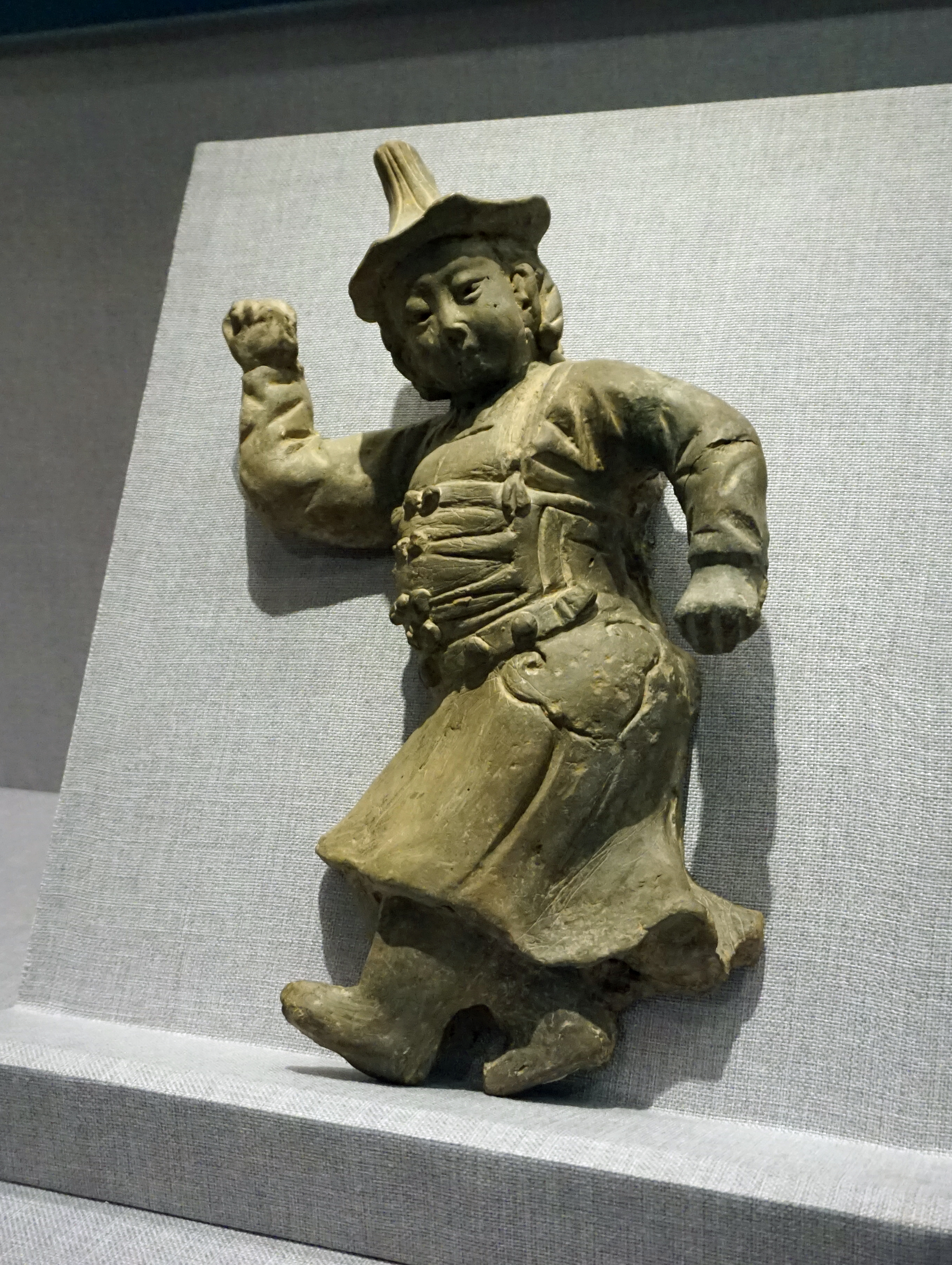

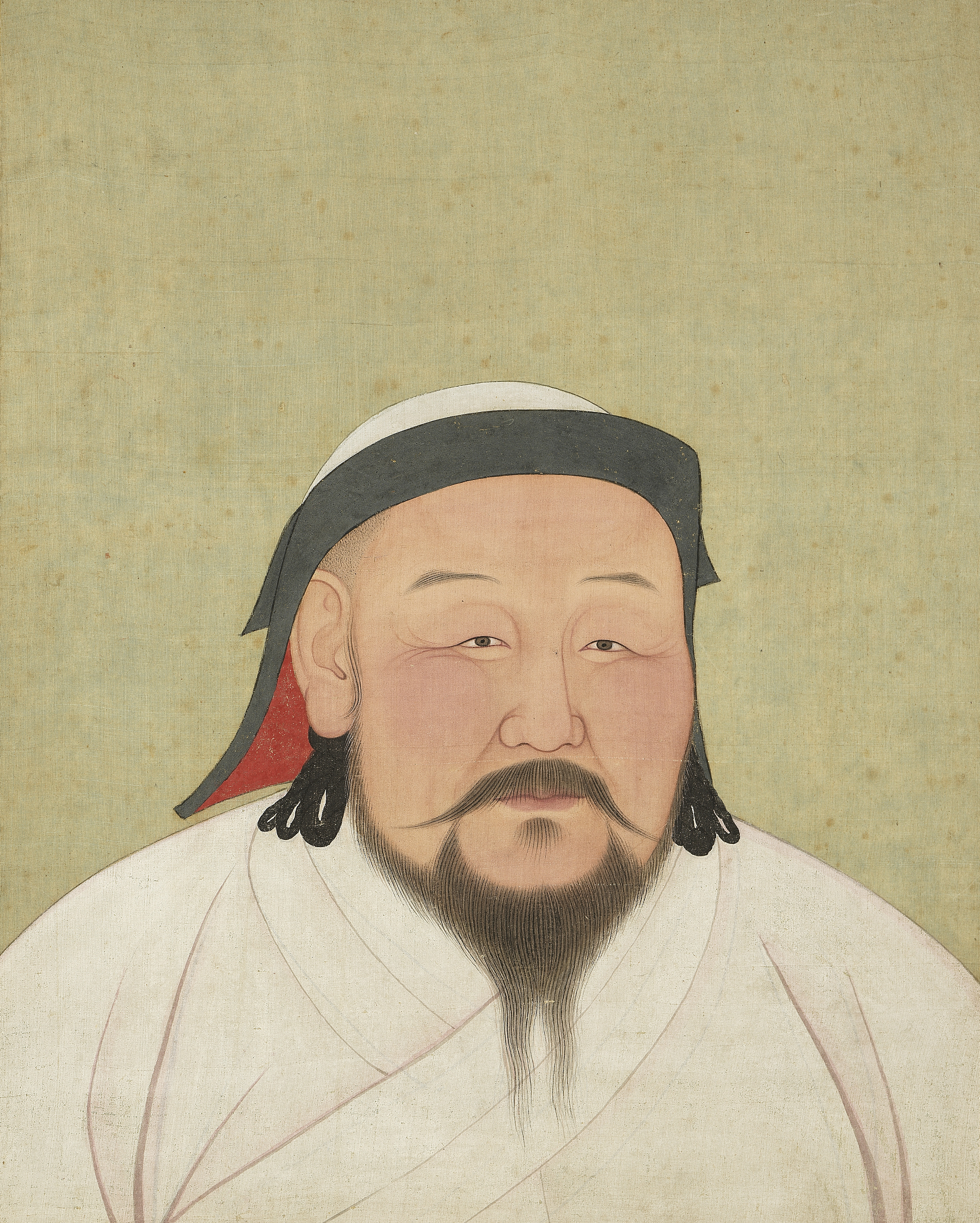
Yuan emperor Kublai Khan.

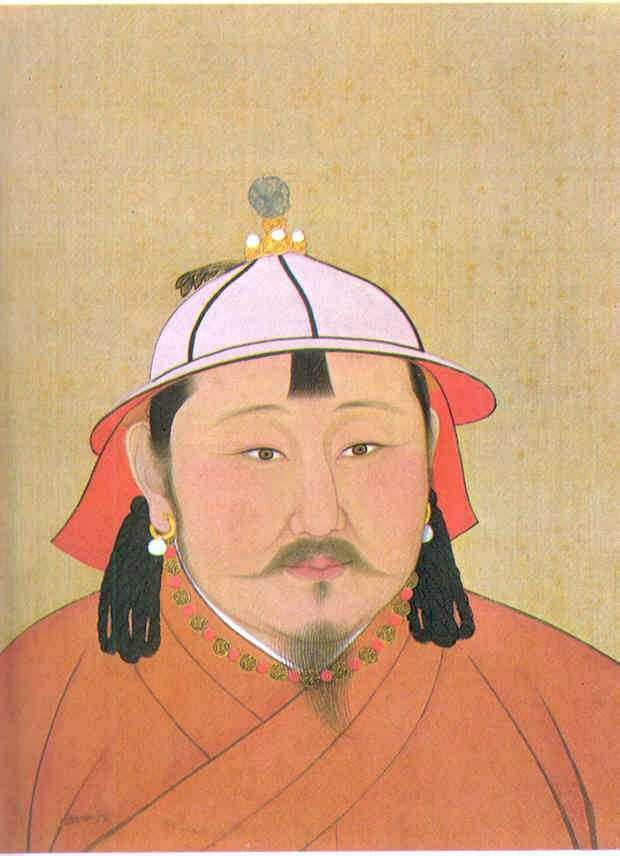
Yuan Emperor Chengzong.

=== Women's clothing ===
==== Mongol robe /deel/ ====
The history of Pre-yuan dynasty Mongol clothing is mainly textual; however, based on textual descriptions from William of Rubruck and others, it appears that the elite Mongol women robe /deel/ had existed prior to the founding of the Yuan dynasty. This robe was exceedingly ample and had long sleeves, and it closed to the side. The ruling class of the Yuan dynasty women did not adopt the Song dynasty-style clothing. The Mongol women in the Yuan dynasty continued to wear the robe that they wore before the fall of the Song dynasty, along with a tall headdress called the boqta hat. That Mongol women robe also appeared to have been worn by the Ilkhanid court noblewomen.

The deel of Mongol women was described as looking similar to the Chinese Taoist garment; it was very wide, was opened in the front, was fastened in three places, was double-breasted, and was cut in the same way as the robe of their male counterpart. It was a side closing robe. The Mongol woman's robe /deel/ was long and was one-piece. Its sleeves were wide and tapered at the wrists; i.e. its sleeves were also narrow-sleeved at the wrists.

According to William of Rubruck:

The costume of the [Mongol women] is no different from that of the men except that it is somewhat longer. But on the day after she is married a woman shaves from the middle of her head to her forehead, and she has a tunic as wide as a nun's cowl, and in every respect wider and longer, and open in front, and this they tie on the right side. Now in this matter the Tartars differ from the Turks, for the Turks tie their tunics on the left, but the Tartars always on the right.

— Shea, Mongol Court Dress, Identity Formation, and Global Exchange, page 80-81

John of Plano Carpini also describes that

the clothes of both the [Mongol] men and the women are made in the same style. They do not use capes, cloaks or hoods, but wear tunics of buckram, velvet, or brocade made in the following fashion: they are open from top to bottom and are folded over the breast; they are fastened on the left with one tie, on the right with three, on the left side also they are open as far as the waist.

— Shea, Mongol Court Dress, Identity Formation, and Global Exchange, Page 80-81

In Chinese sources, the Mongol women clothing was described by Zhao Hong (in 1221 AD) as being ample and having a side closing;

similar to the garments of the Chinese Daoists... Furthermore, they have a jacket with wide sleeves, which resembles the Chinese "crane cloak"; it is wide and long and drags on the ground. When they walk, two female servants carry [the train of the robe]

— Shea, Mongol Court Dress, Identity Formation, and Global Exchange, page 80-81

These historical accounts appear to correspond to both the surviving Yuan dynasty court women robes and from the pictorial evidences from both the Yuan and Ilkhanate court arts. The similarity of the Mongol women robe to the Mongol men's robe (i.e. terlig) do not appear true based on the surviving material evidence.

The long, red Mongol robe became the official dress was worn by elite Mongol women. It was a form of outwear; it also worn with the gugu hat, which was red in colour for the Empress and court ladies. The use of wide red robes and red gugu hat worn Empresses (Khatun) and court ladies by can be seen in the depictions of the Yuan dynasty and the Ilkhanid dynasty in Iran and West Asia. Robes which corresponds to the red Mongol court dresses have also been excavated in the Northern Yuan territory in present-day Inner Mongolia, Hebei, Shaanxi; the robes are wide and the sleeves are loose with tampered sleeves (wrist cuff are narrow).

==== Overjacket ====
Another woman's garment worn during the Yuan dynasty is a short overjacket.

==== Shoes ====
Mongol women also did not engage in foot binding practice and often wore boots and embroidered silk slippers or shoe covers for unbound feet.

Mongol women clothing

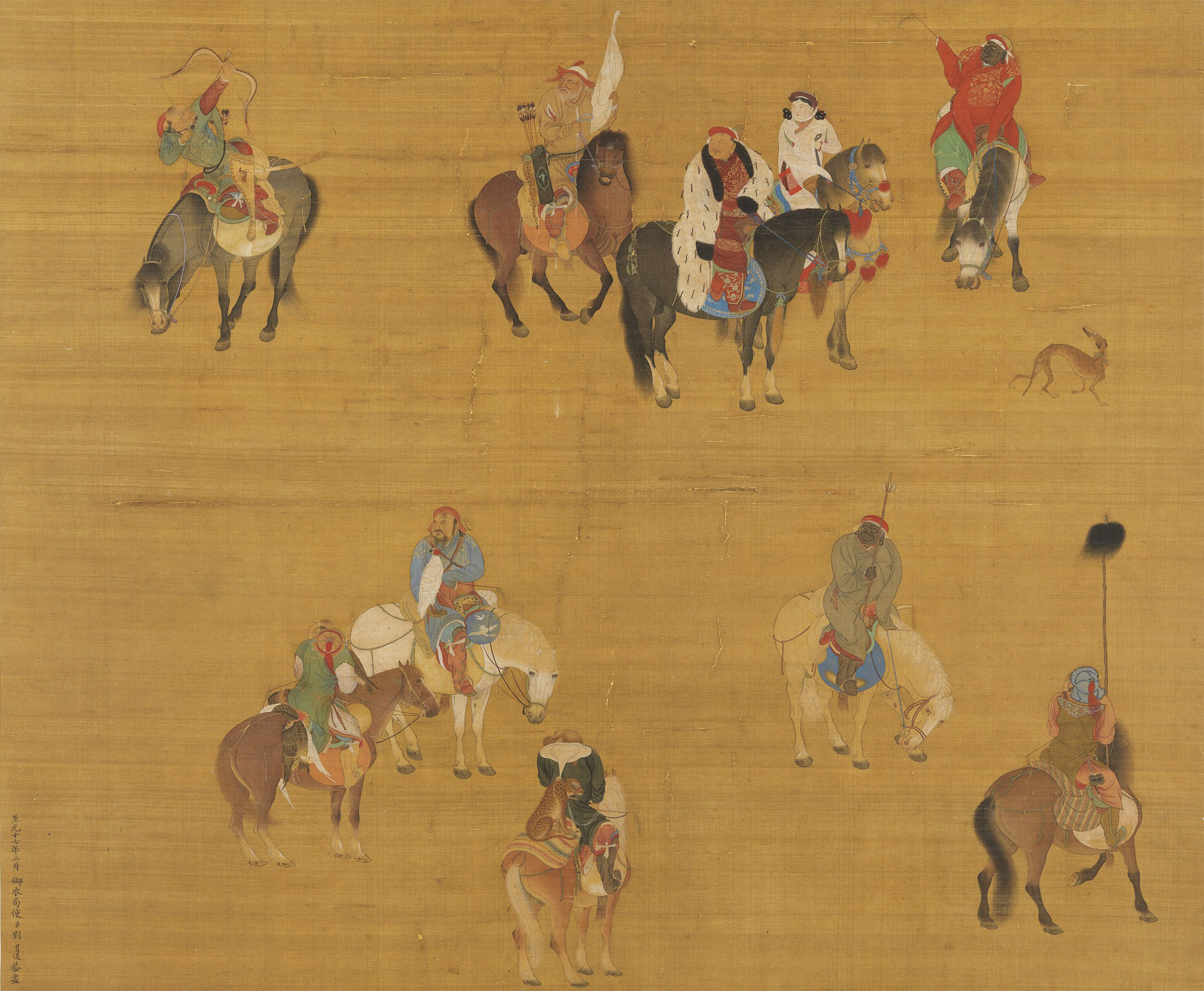
Kublai Khan, Empress Chabi, and his men going for hunt are all wearing Mongolian-style attire, which is distinct from Han Chinese clothing, Yuan dynasty by Liu Guandao, c. 1280.

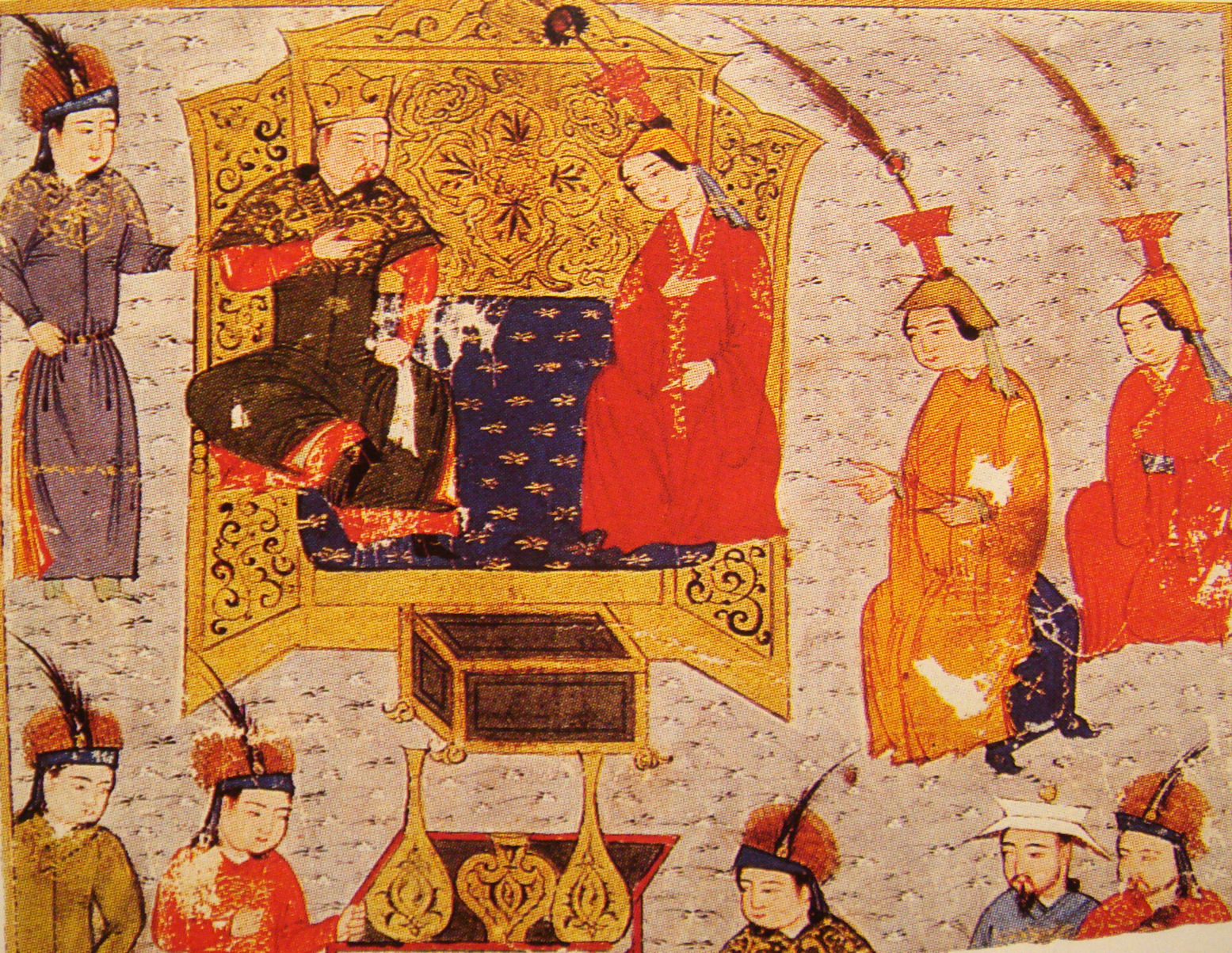
Tolui With Queen Sorgaqtani, parents of Kublai Khan, and their surrounding all wear Mongol-style clothing, painting by Rashid-al-Din Hamadani in the Jami' al-tawarikh, early 14th century AD.

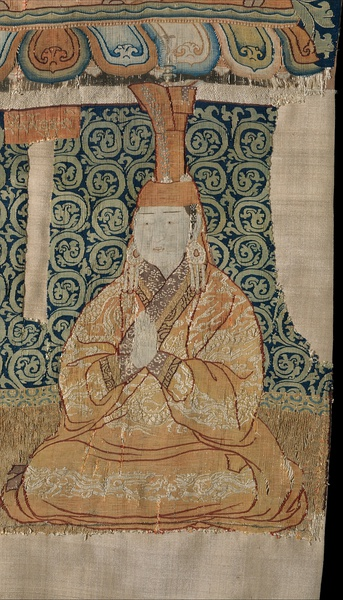
A Khatun, Yuan dynasty, ca. 1330–32.

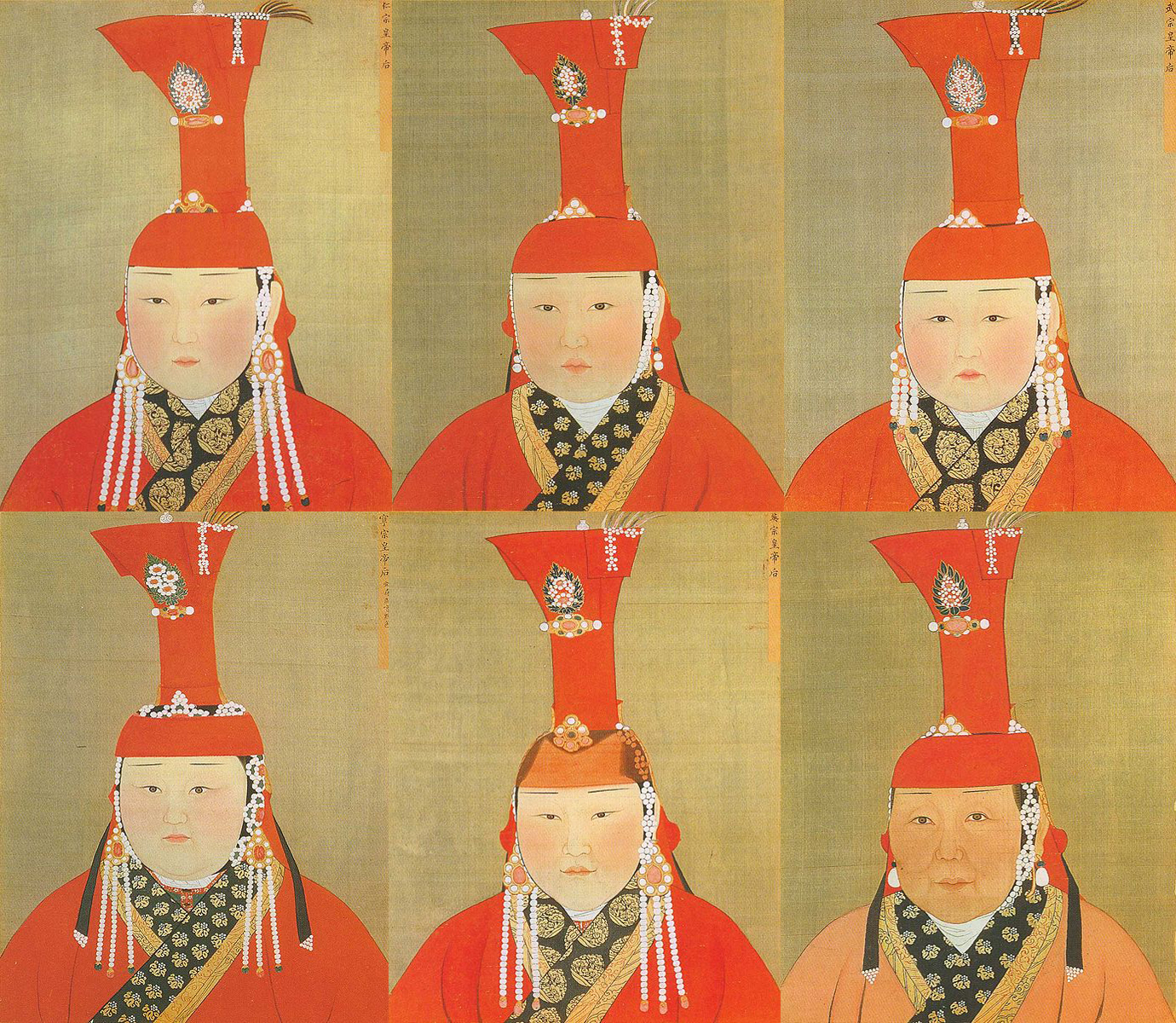
Portrait of Yuan dynasty empresses, wearing the Mongolian robe and guguhat; a distinct way of dressing from the Han Chinese women.

== Han Chinese clothing ==
The Yuan dynasty court clothing also allowed the mixed of Mongol- and Han-style. The first Mongol khan to wear Chinese clothing was Möngke (1251–1259 AD) who wore the robes of the Son of Heaven, which form of Ceremonial dress of the Chinese emperors worn during the Worshipping of Heaven. According to the Yuanshi, Möngke wore the gunmian in 1252.

In the Yuan dynasty, the Mongols never imposed Mongol customs on the ethnic Han, and they did not force the Han Chinese to wear Mongol clothing. Many Han Chinese and other ethnicities readily adopted Mongol clothing in Northern China to show their allegiance to the Yuan rulers; however, in Southern China, Mongol clothing was rarely seen as both men and women continued to dress in Song-style garments.

The type of clothing worn in the Yuan dynasty may have also served as a political statement; for example, despite not being the clothing of the ruling elite, the Tang-Song style clothing also continued to be worn in multiple layers by families who showed that they were resisting the rule of the Mongols. The Song style dress also continued to persist among the southern elites of the Yuan dynasty and evidence of Song-style clothing was also found in the unearthed tombs in southern China. The casual clothing for men mainly followed the dress code of the Han people and they wore banbi as a casual clothing item while ordinary women clothing consisted of banbi and ruqun. The wearing short-length cross-collar upper garment over long narrow skirt was also a Song-style woman fashion. Long cross-collar upper garment (about the knee-length) over a long skirt could also be worn by Chinese elite women. Han Chinese women also wore a combination of a cross-collar upper garment which had elbow length sleeves (i.e. cross-collar banbi) over a long-sleeved blouse under a skirt with an abbreviated wrap skirts were also popular in Yuan. This form of set of clothing was a style which slightly deviated from the ruqun worn in the Tang and Song dynasties. It was also common for Chinese women in the Yuan dynasty to close their clothing to the left side (instead of the right side).

Han Chinese clothing

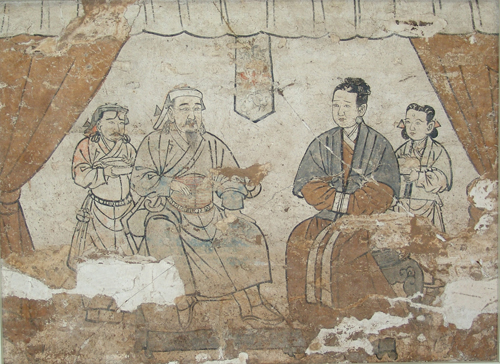
The tomb occupants are Han but are wearing Mongol-style clothing. The female tomb occupant is depicted wearing the woman's red Mongol robe under a short overjacket but does not wear the gugu hat, Shazishan Tomb Fresco, Yuan Dynasty.

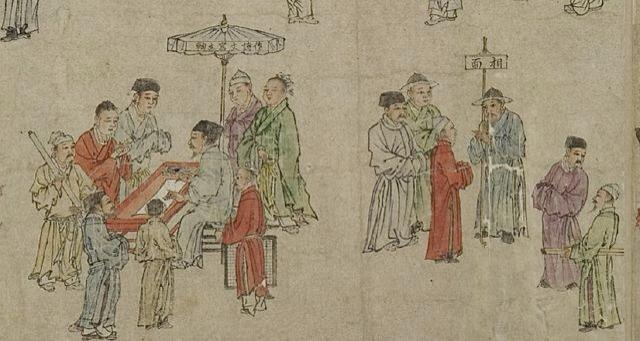
A community in Yuan dynasty; some of the hats and clothing of these figures appear to be Mongol-style; from the painting Street Scenes in Times of Peace (Chinese: 太平風會圖), Yuan dynasty 14th century.

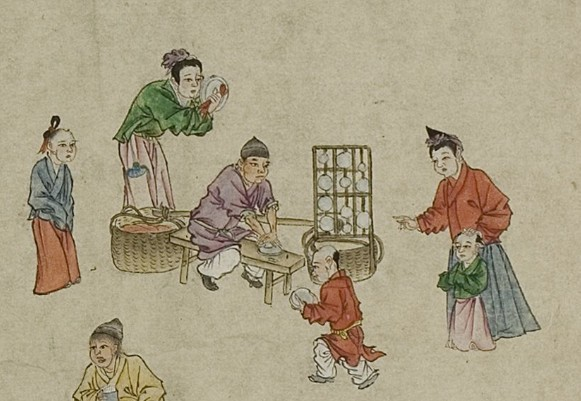
A community in Yuan dynasty; some of the hats and clothing of these figures appear to be Mongol-style; from the painting Street Scenes in Times of Peace (Chinese: 太平風會圖), Yuan dynasty 14th century.

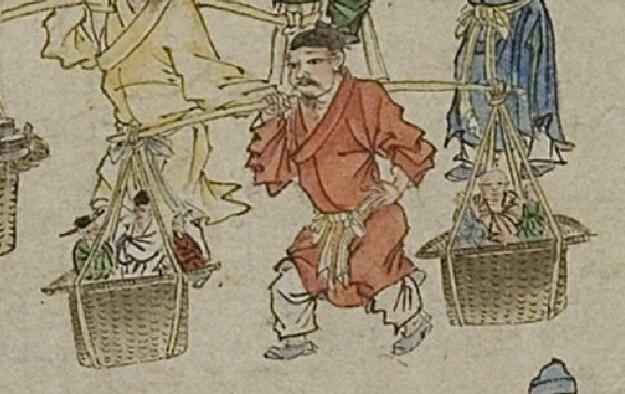
A community in Yuan dynasty; some of the hats and clothing of these figures appear to be Mongol-style; from the painting Street Scenes in Times of Peace (Chinese: 太平風會圖), Yuan dynasty 14th century.

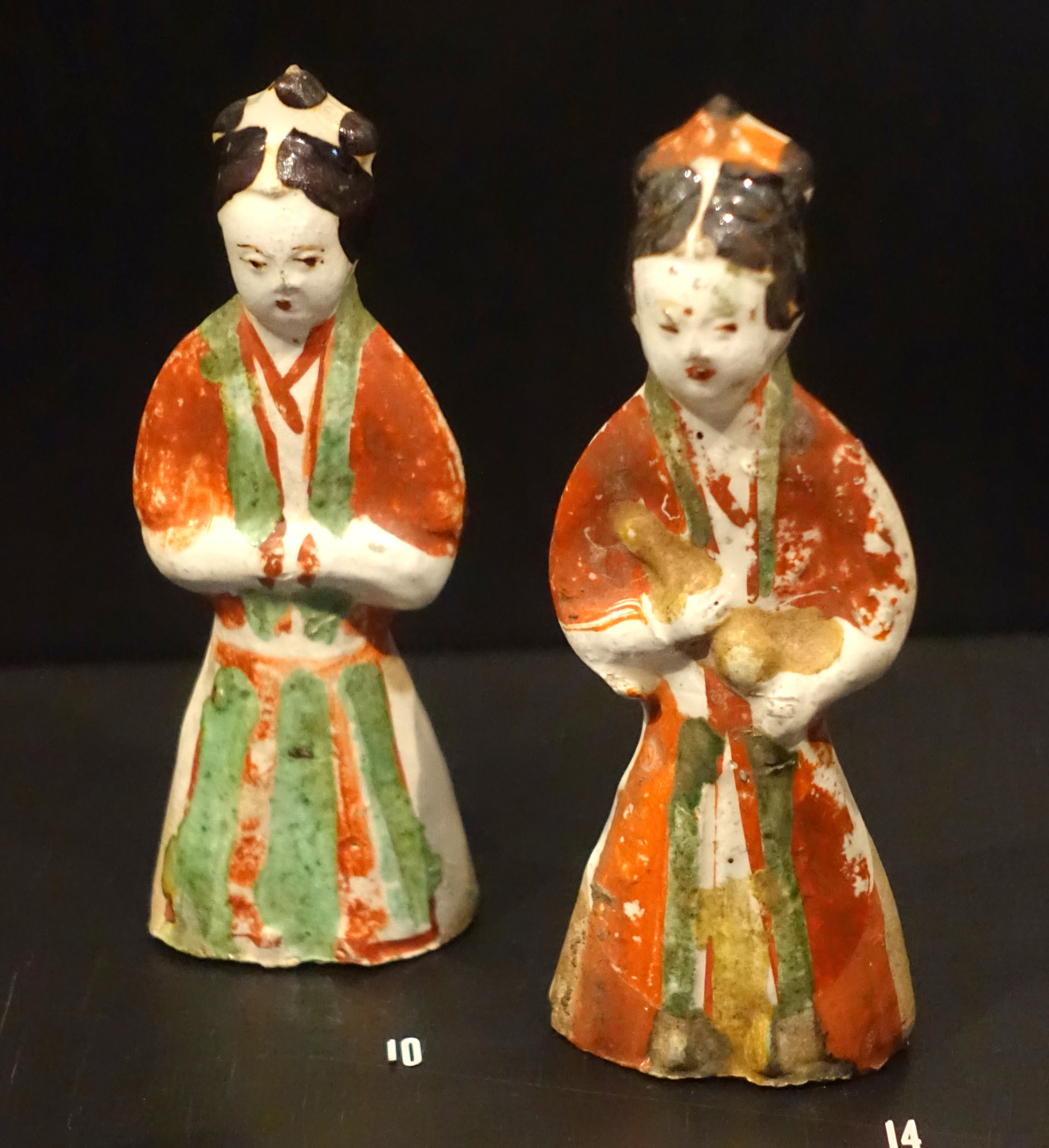
Yuan dynasty female figures wearing ruqun and banbi.

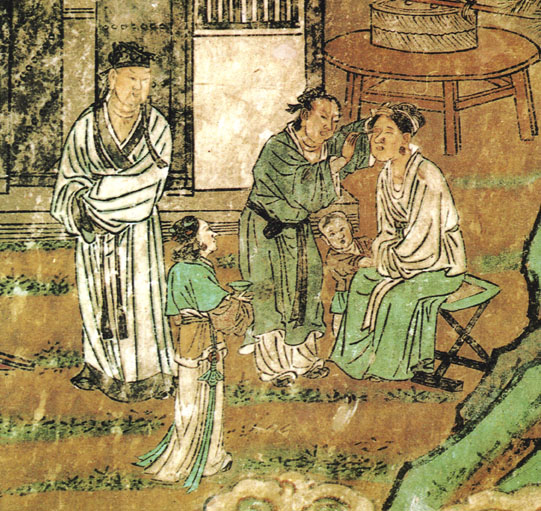
A Chinese wall mural painting from a Daoist temple, Yuan dynasty painting.

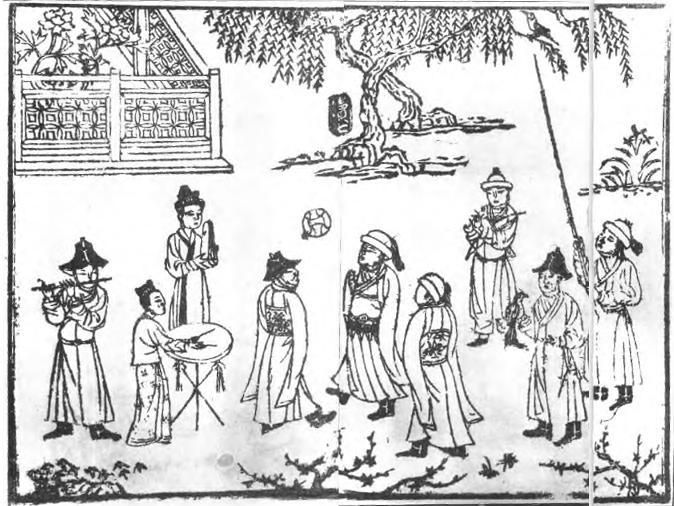
Yuan dynasty illustration of people wearing hanfu and playing Cuju (from the Shilin Guangji by Chen Yuanjing)

== Goryeo-style clothing ==
Near the end of the Yuan dynasty, clothing style from Goryeo became popular and was perceived as beautiful; they were adopted by Mongol rulers. The Mongol aristocrats, queens and imperial concubines started to imitate the clothing style of Goryeo women. The diffusion of Goryeo culture (including clothing customs) in the upper class culture of the Mongols has been attributed to the last Empress of the Yuan dynasty; Empress Gi, who was the empress of Toghon Temür and became first empress in 1365 (a time when the Yuan dynasty's control over China was dissolving) exercised great power as soon as she became empress.

During the Yuan dynasty, the Mongol forced the rulers of Goryeo to send Goryeo women and children to the Yuan. Many people from Goryeo were sent to live in Yuan against their will, and most of them were the Kongnyo (Chinese: 貢女; lit. 'tribute women'), eunuchs and war prisoners. Between 1275 and 1355, there were approximately 50 instances where Goryeo tribute women were sent to the Mongol court by the Goryeo court. There were approximately 2000 young Goryeo women who were sent to Yuan as Kongnyo; they were considered beautiful women and excellent servants, but most of them lived in exhausting lifestyles which were marked with hard labour and sexual abuse. The Kongnyo were in effect slaves who were sent to Yuan as a sign of Goryeo submission to Yuan. Only some of them were able to become the concubines or wives of Yuan's noblemen. Moreover, although envoys from the Yuan dynasty would travel to Goryeo on a regular basis in order to gain some women on behalf of the Yuan Emperor; the Yuan Emperor would often redistribute these women to the Yuan ministers as gifts. There is also no records of other Goryeo women becoming of consorts of the previous emperors of Yuan dynasty beside Empress Gi as Goryeo women sent to Yuan by the Goryeo court were considered of low origins at that time; moreover, the previous Yuan dynasty Emperors followed the will of Kublai Khan, who said that "[Goryeo] women shall not participate with Our sons and grandsons in the affairs of the imperial ancestral temple"; thus forbidding his descendants from marrying Goryeo women as a family rule. The ascension of Empress Gi as Empress was a total disregard to the Yuan dynasty tradition which did not allow non-Mongol women to become principal empresses.

Empress Gi was one of those Kongnyo women. When Empress Gi became empress of Yuan, she started to recruit many Goryeo court maids in the palace. Due the presence of these recruited Kongnyo women, Goryeo-style became common in the Mongol court; in the 14th century, it was recorded in the Gengshen Waishi《庚申外史》 that: "Among prominent officials and influential people in the capital city [Dadu], acquisition of a Koryŏ woman has become [popular, or a "must have"] for one to be considered a leading light [notable]. The Koryŏ women are amiable and yielding; they excel in serving (their lords) to such a degree that they often win (his) favor (away from other women). Since the Zhizheng reign period [1341–1368], most of the palace stewards and attendants in the imperial palace are Koryŏ women. For this reason, everywhere clothes, shoes, hats, and utensils all follow the [Goryeo] style". This showed that Korean women were preferred in the last decades of the Yuan dynasty to the point that fetishism was developed around them. The late Yuan dynasty poet Zhang Xu also wrote a few poems about the popularity of Goryeo-style, which was dubbed as Goryeoyang (Chinese: 高麗樣). At the end of the Yuan dynasty, the Goryeoyang clothing is described as a short, banryong (方領, square collar) banbi (半臂, a short sleeve upper garment) which passed beneath the waist. According to Hyunhee Park: "Like the Mongolian style, it is possible that this Koryŏ style [Koryŏ yang] continued to influence some Chinese in the Ming period after the Ming dynasty replaced the Yuan dynasty, a topic to investigate further."

== Theatre clothing ==
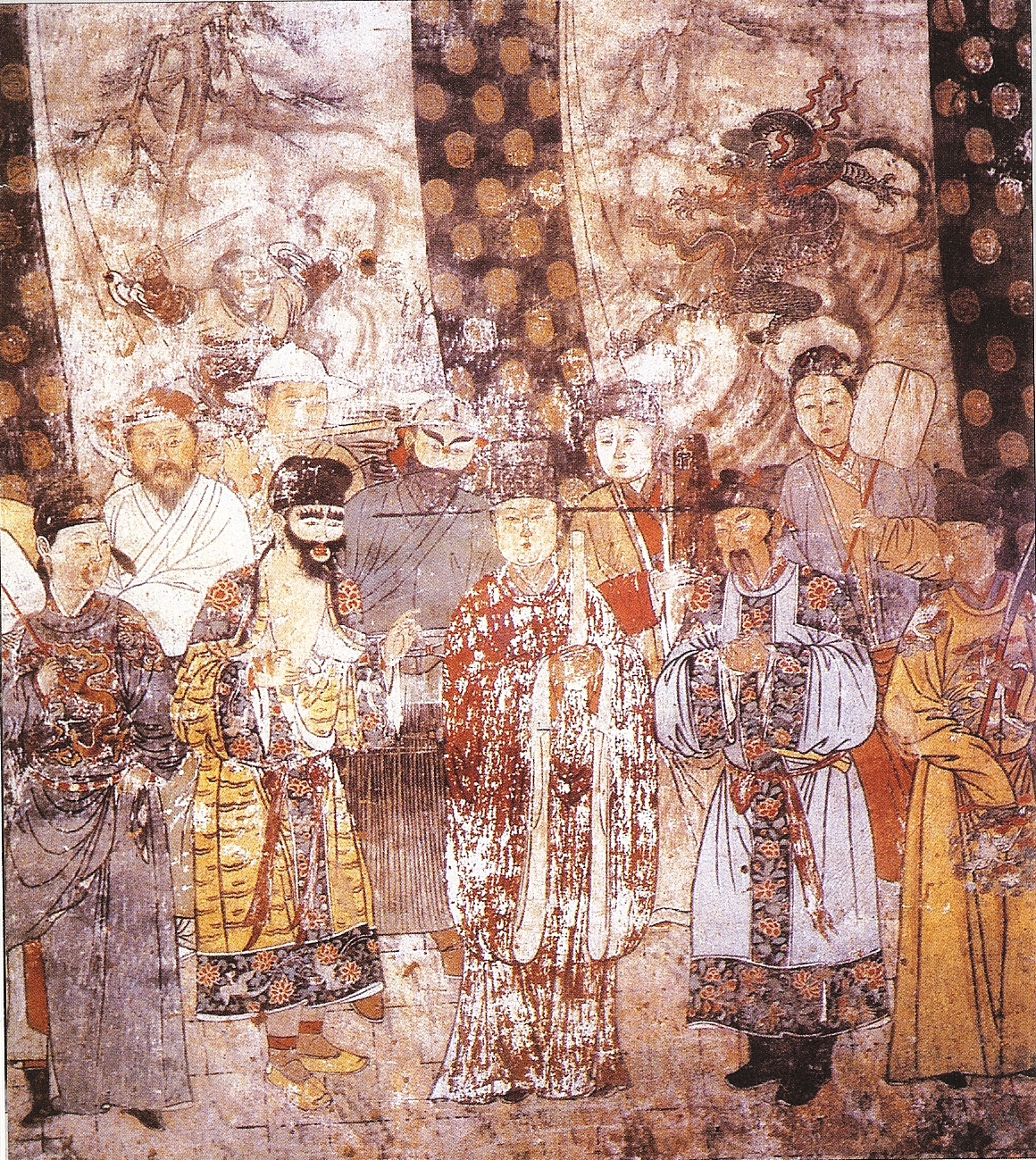
Yuan dynasty theatre actors wore elaborate costumes and stereotyped facial makeup; diverse costumes of different nationalities were worn, Yuan dynasty, 1324 AD.

In the Yuan dynasty, theatre zaju drama actors wore all different clothes ranging from Jurchen, to Khitan, to Mongol, to Song Han Chinese clothes.

== Legacy ==
After the fall of the Yuan dynasty, any clothing which was not Hanfu was banned in the succeeding Ming dynasty. However, the influence of Mongol clothing could not be erased completely; and some clothing in the Ming dynasty had absorbed elements of both the Hanfu and the Mongol clothing of the Yuan dynasty. Other forms of clothing was directly adapted from Mongol clothing and was localized; i.e. the hats damao (大帽; big hat), humao (胡帽; "barbarian hat"), and the xiaomao (小帽; "small hat"); the robes yesa (曳撒) and tieli (贴里);, and the dahu (褡护) jacket. The zhisun also continued to be worn in the Ming dynasty.

== See also ==
- Han Chinese clothing – Hanfu; Yunjian
- Non-Han Chinese clothing – Hanbok; Hufu; Zhisun
- Deel
- Yuan dynasty
- Fashion in the Liao dynasty
