= Tahu =

Tahu may refer to:

== Geography ==
- Tahu, Palpa, a village development committee in Nepal
- Tahu, Estonia, village in Lääne-Nigula Parish, Lääne County, Estonia; Swedish name: Skåtanäs
- Tahu Culture in southern Taiwan

== People ==
First name

- Tahu Hole (1906–1985), New Zealand-born BBC journalist
- Tahu Matheson (born 1977), New Zealand pianist and conductor
- Teddy Tahu Rhodes (born 1966), New Zealand operatic baritone

Last name

- Matiu Parakatone Tahu (?–1863), New Zealand tribal tohunga (expert) and mission teacher
- Timana Tahu (born 1980), Australian rugby league and rugby union player

== Other ==
- Tahu, a fictional character in the Bionicle franchise produced by Lego
- Indonesian and Tamil name for tofu

== See also ==
- Dahu (disambiguation)
