= Bijia =

Traditional Chinese sleeveless and collarless vest

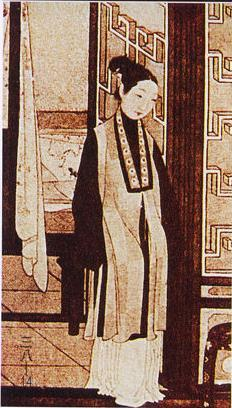
- A woman wearing a Qing dynasty bijia.
- Chinese: 比甲
Transcriptions
Standard Mandarin
- Hanyu Pinyin: Bǐjiǎ

Bijia (Chinese: 比甲) is a long, sleeveless jacket of Mongol origins which has opened side slits. The bijia started to be worn in the Yuan dynasty when it was designed by Empress Chabi. The bijia eventually became one of the most typical form of women's clothing item in the Ming dynasty and in the Qing dynasty. It is also a type of hanfu which has been revived in present days.

== History ==
=== Yuan dynasty ===
The bijia originated from a long-length Mongol vest. According to the Yuan shi, the invention of bijiia is attributed to Empress Chabi during the Yuan dynasty. Empress Chabi designed the bijia so that it would be a convenient form of attire while riding horses and shooting arrows. The front region of the bijia designed by Empress Chabi was made of 1-piece of fabric, and its back region was twice longer than the front region. It was collarless and sleeveless, and there were two loop straps which attached to it. It also had no lapels. The bijia was first worn by the Yuan dynasty emperor but it later became popular among commoners.

=== Ming dynasty ===
After the fall of the Yuan dynasty, Mongol fashion of the Yuan dynasty continued to influence some styles of clothing worn in the Ming dynasty; this included the persisting usage of bijia. The bijia became a type of women clothing in the Ming dynasty, and by the middle of the Ming dynasty it had become a favourite form of dress for women, especially young women.

In the Ming dynasty, the bijia was long in length and would reach below the knee level. It was embroidered on woven textile and a jade ornament would be attached at the front of the bijia as a front closure. Bijia created an illusion of slenderness, which women in the Ming dynasty sought after.

=== Qing dynasty ===
In the Qing dynasty, Han Chinese women were allowed to continue the Ming dynasty clothing customs. The bijia remained very popular in Qing dynasty, and it was one of the most common forms of female clothing worn in the 17th and 18th century.

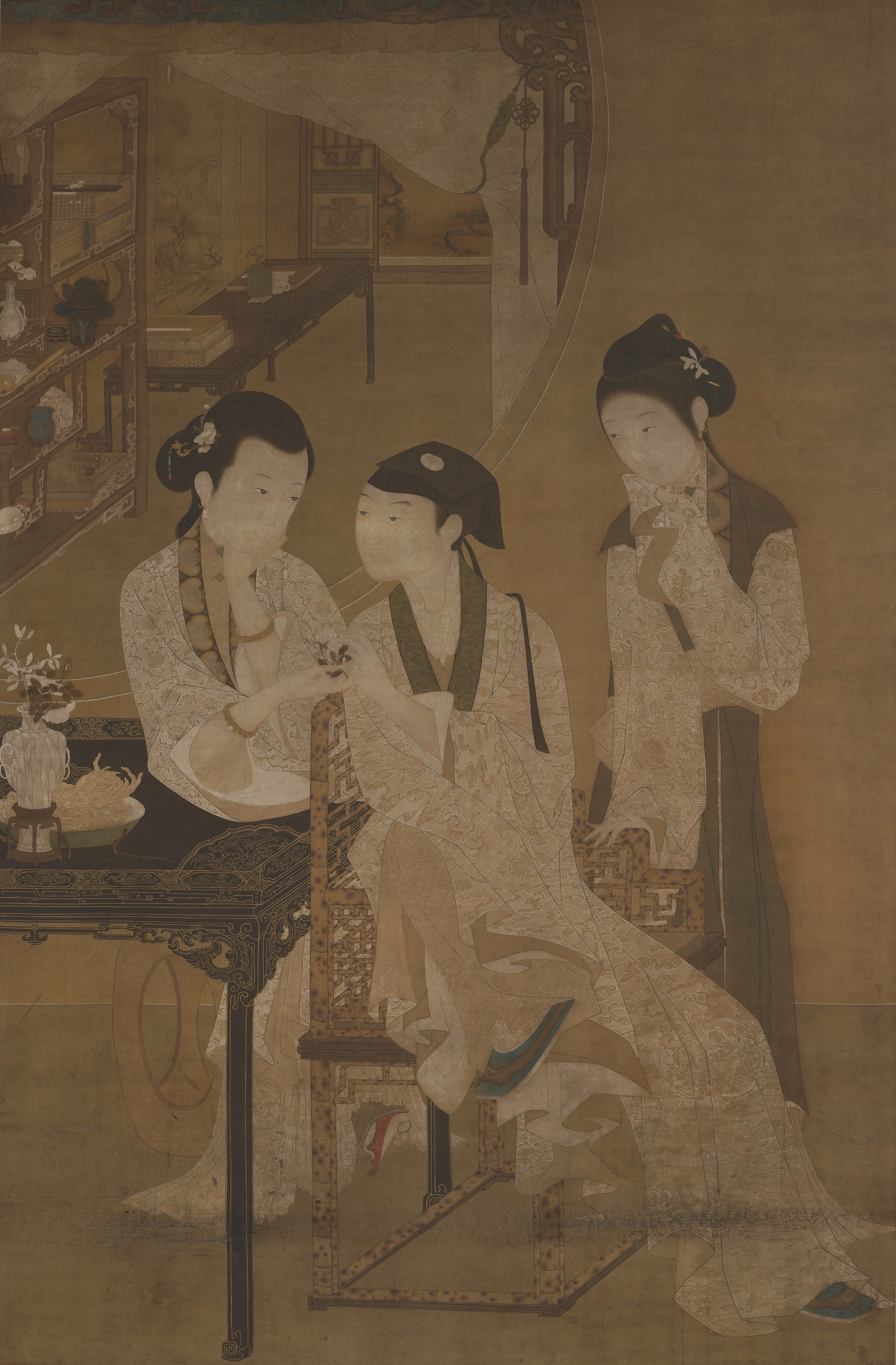
Woman wearing bijia (right). Woman wearing beizi (left). From the painting Amorous Meeting in a Room Interior, late 18th century Qing Dynasty.

=== 21st Century ===
In the 21st century, the bijia regained popularity and is widely worn as a hanfu item.

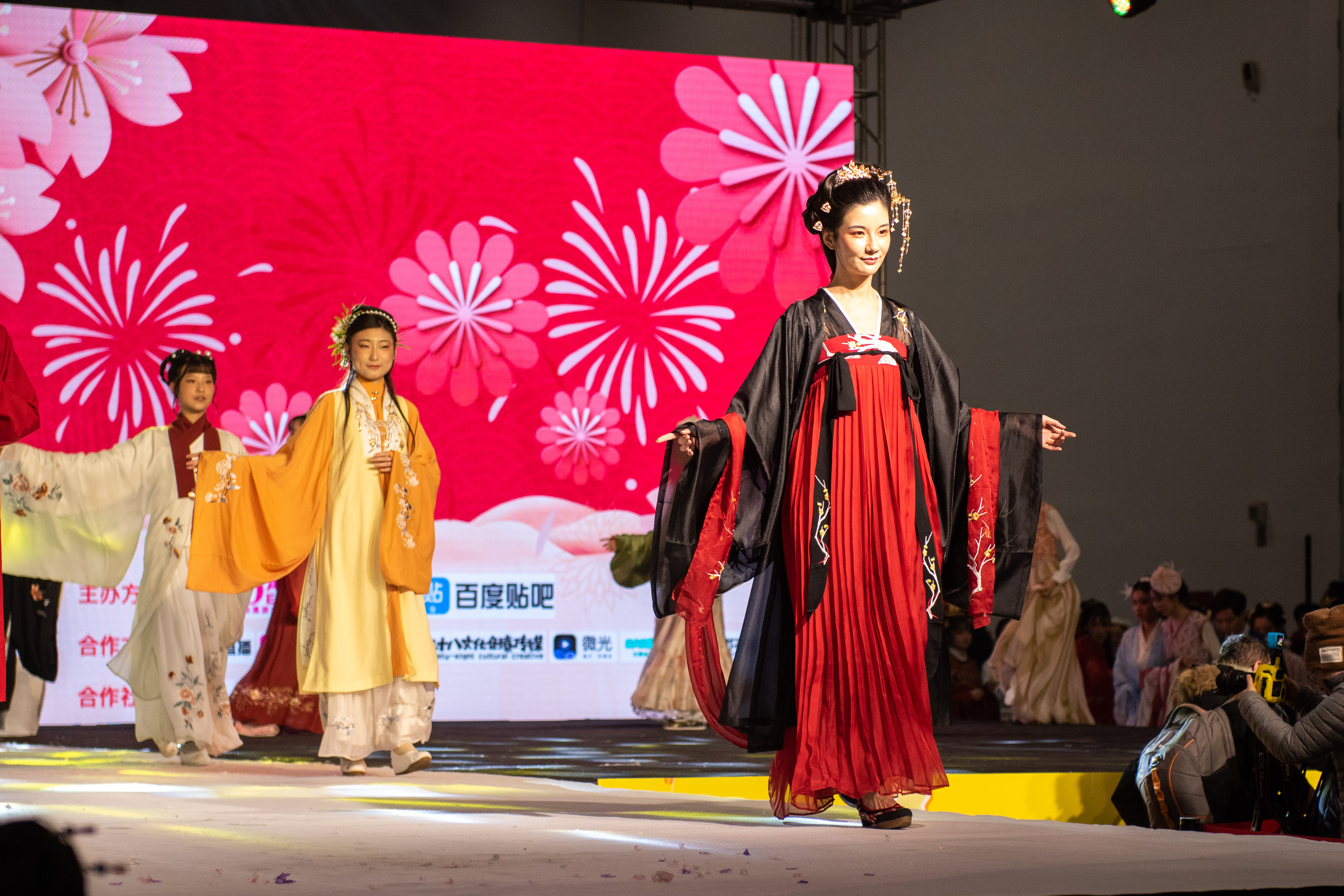
Woman wearing a long, yellow bijia (middle), 2020.

== Influences and derivatives ==
=== Theatrical beixin ===
The Chinese opera beixin (Chinese: 背心), also known as kanjian, majia, and beida, were sleeveless vests which originated from both the Ming dynasty's long-length bijia worn by women from the lower-middle class and from the Qing dynasty's majia (Chinese: 马甲), a type of vest which were worn by the Manchu.

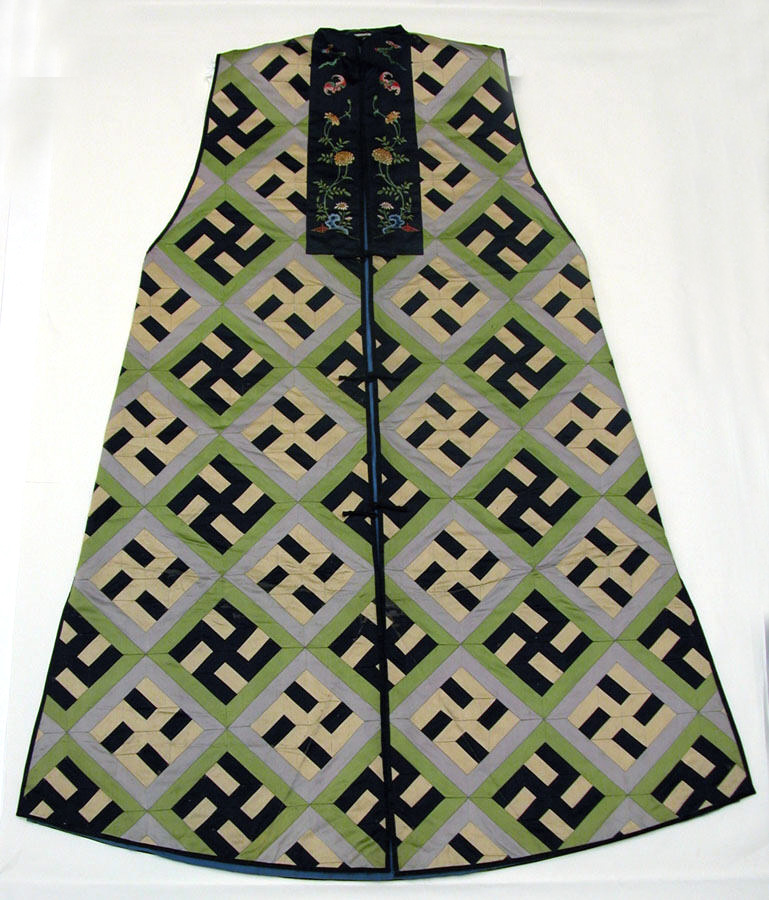
Theatrical beixin for a female Buddhist priest (front view).

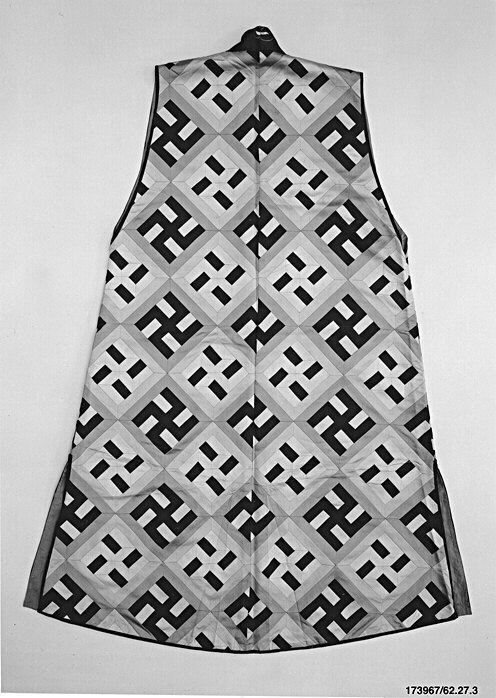
Theatrical beixin for a female Buddhist priest (back view).

=== Majia ===
The majia (Chinese: 马甲), the sleeveless riding vest of the Qing dynasty, evolved from the bijia which was popular among women during the Ming and Qing dynasties.

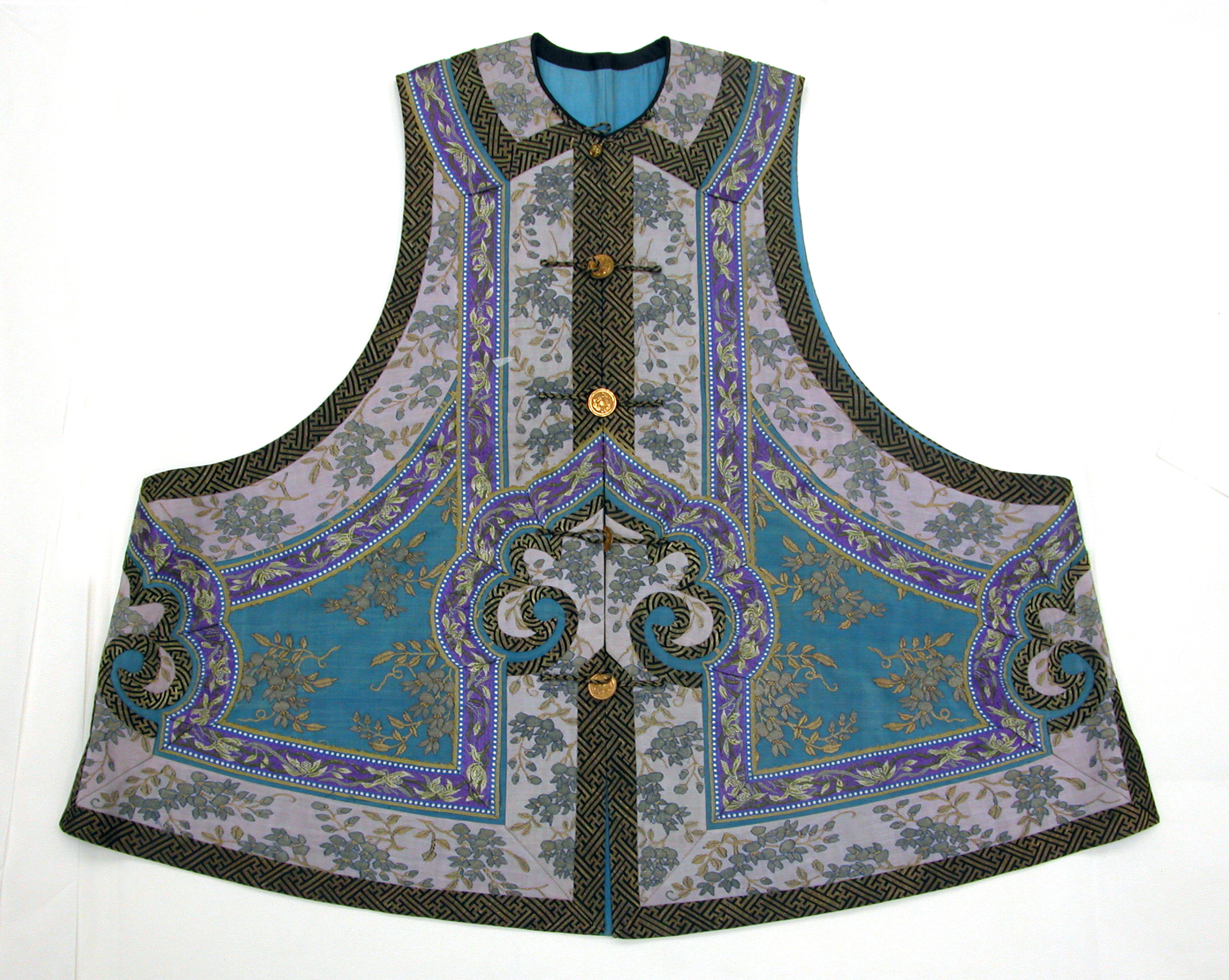
Sleeveless Jacket with Flowering Vine Pattern and Bands (front), late 19th–early 20th century

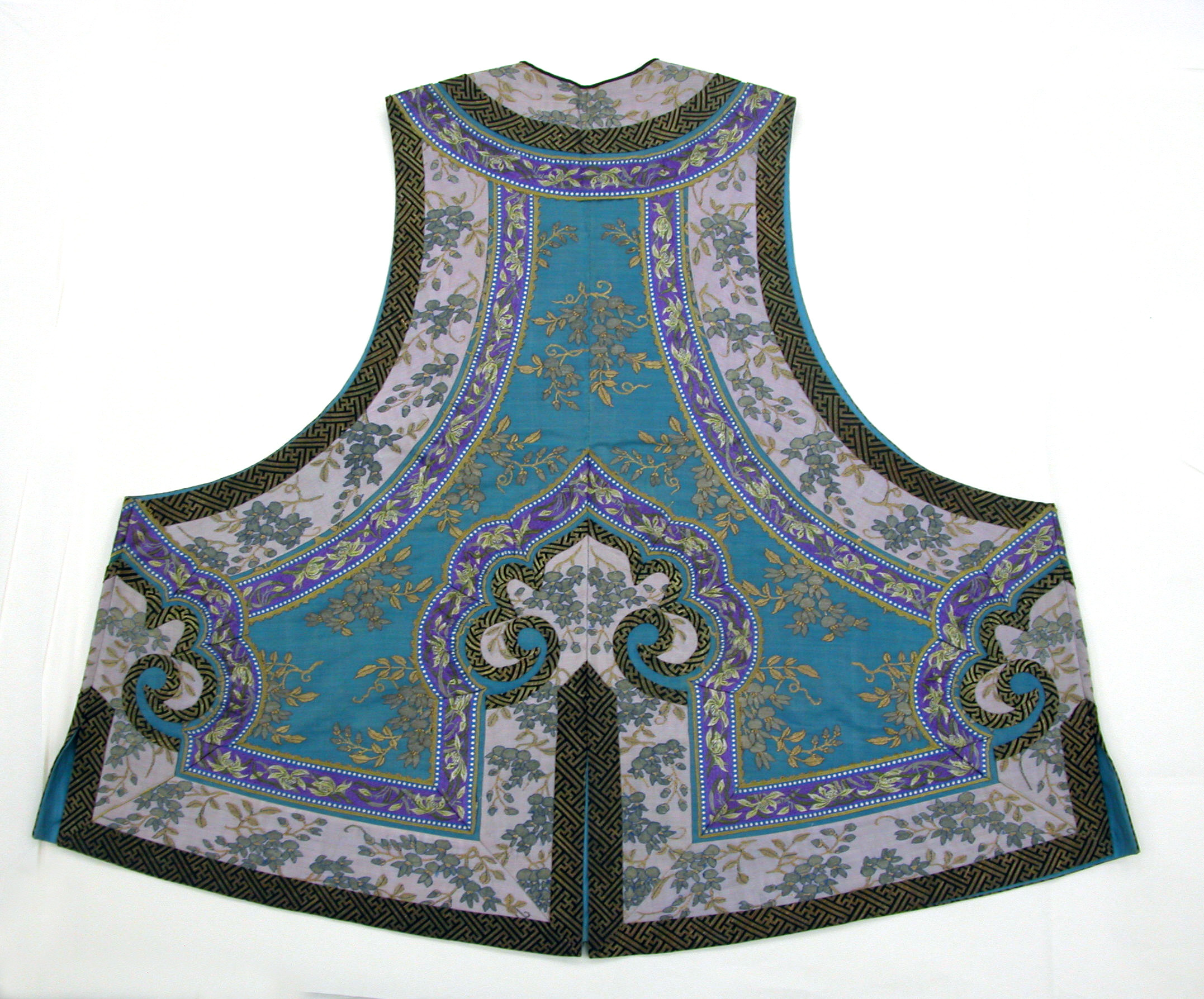
Sleeveless Jacket with Flowering Vine Pattern and Bands (back), late 19th–early 20th century

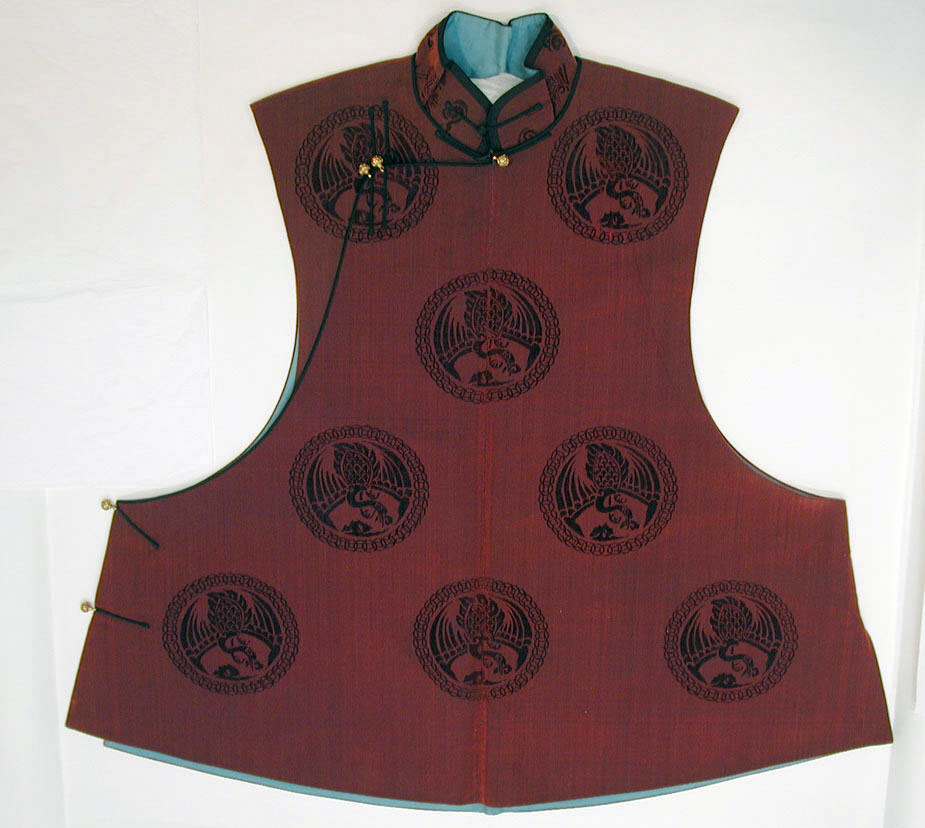
Sleeveless Jacket, 19th century.

== Similar looking garments ==
- Banbi
- Song dynasty beixin - Sleeveless and translucent vests, which became a popular female fashion in the Southern Song.
- Dahu
- Zhaojia (罩甲)
- Baeja - A sleeveless or very short-sleeved vest in Korea
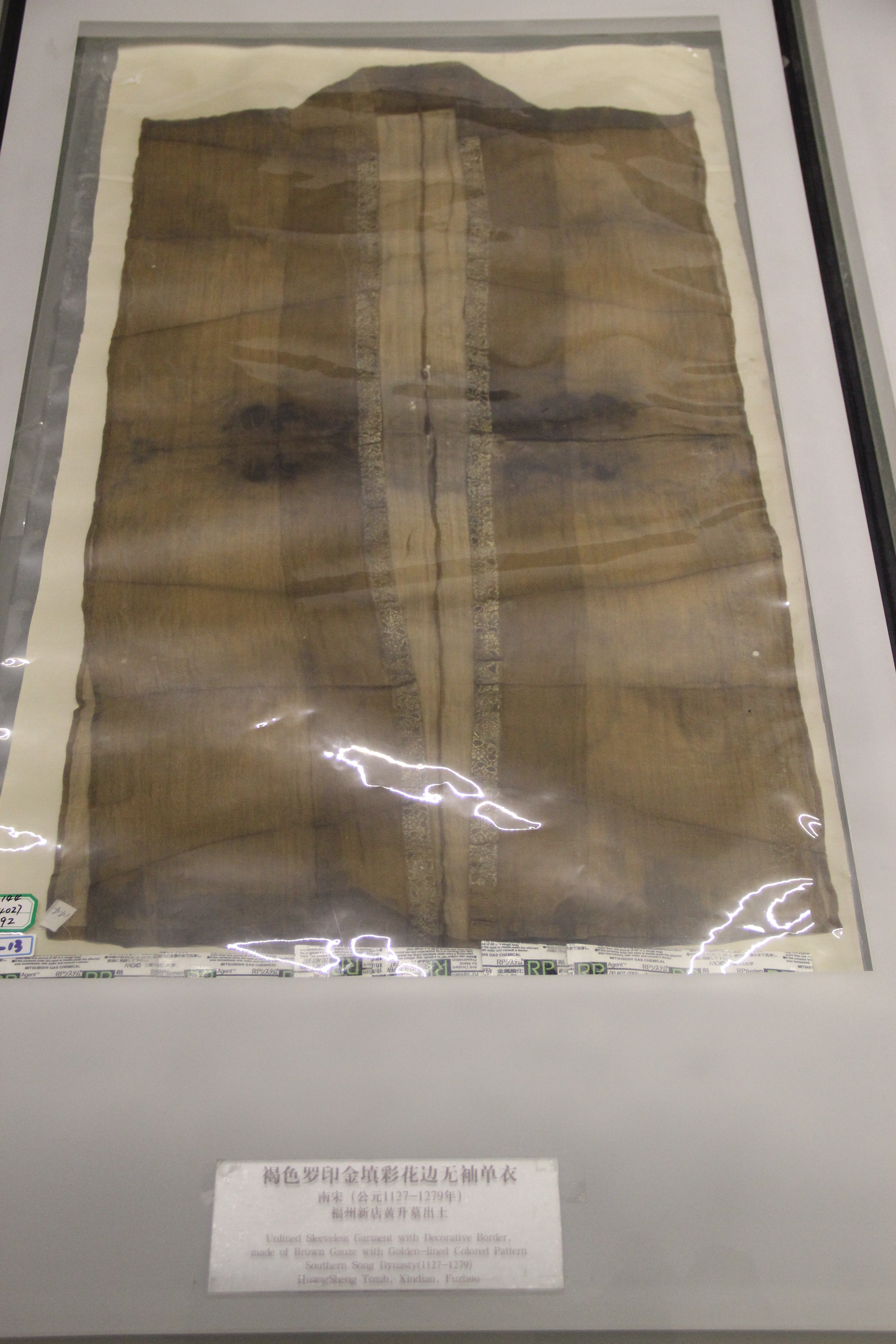
Beixin, Song dynasty

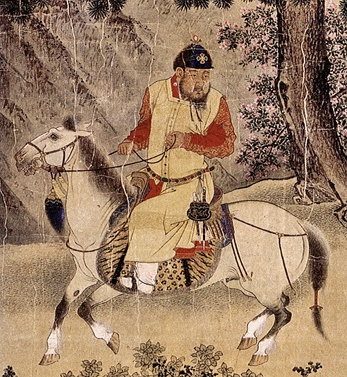
Zhaojia, Ming dynasty

== See also ==
- Beizi
- Fashion in Yuan dynasty
- Hanfu
- List of Hanfu
