= Matiu (name) =

Matiu is both a given name and a surname. It is a Māori transliteration of the name Matthew. Notable people with the name include:

== Given name ==
- Matiu Dickson (1952–2016), New Zealand lawyer, teacher, academic, politician, and activist
- Matiu Parakatone Tahu (?–1863/64?), New Zealand tribal tohunga and mission teacher
- Matiu Rata (1934–1997), New Zealand politician
- Matiu Rātana (1912–1949), New Zealand politician
- Matiu Ratana (police officer) (1966–2020), New Zealand-born British police officer and murder victim
- Matiu Te Auripo Te Hau (1912–1978), New Zealand teacher, educationalist, and community leader
- Matiu Te Rei (born 1948), Māori leader
- Matiu Walters, New Zealand singer and musician

== Surname ==
- Legi Matiu (born 1969), New Zealand-born French rugby union player

== Stage name ==
- Matiu (musician) (born 1986), Innu singer-songwriter
