= Dahu (disambiguation) =

Dahu is a legendary creature in European popular culture.

Dahu may also refer to:

== Places ==
=== China ===
- Dahu, Liuyang, a town in Liuyang, Hunan

=== Iran ===
- Dahu, Bushehr, a village in Bushehr Province
- Dahu, Zarand, a village in Kerman Province

=== Taiwan ===
- Dahu, Miaoli, a township in southern Miaoli County
- Dahu Park, a park and lake in Taipei

== Other uses ==
- Dahu (instrument), a Chinese bowed string instrument
- Dahu (clothing), a Han Chinese clothing which originated in the Ming dynasty.
- Dahu, courtesy name of Sun Luban, Chinese princess of the Eastern Wu state in the Three Kingdoms period
