= Baeja =

Traditional Korean vest

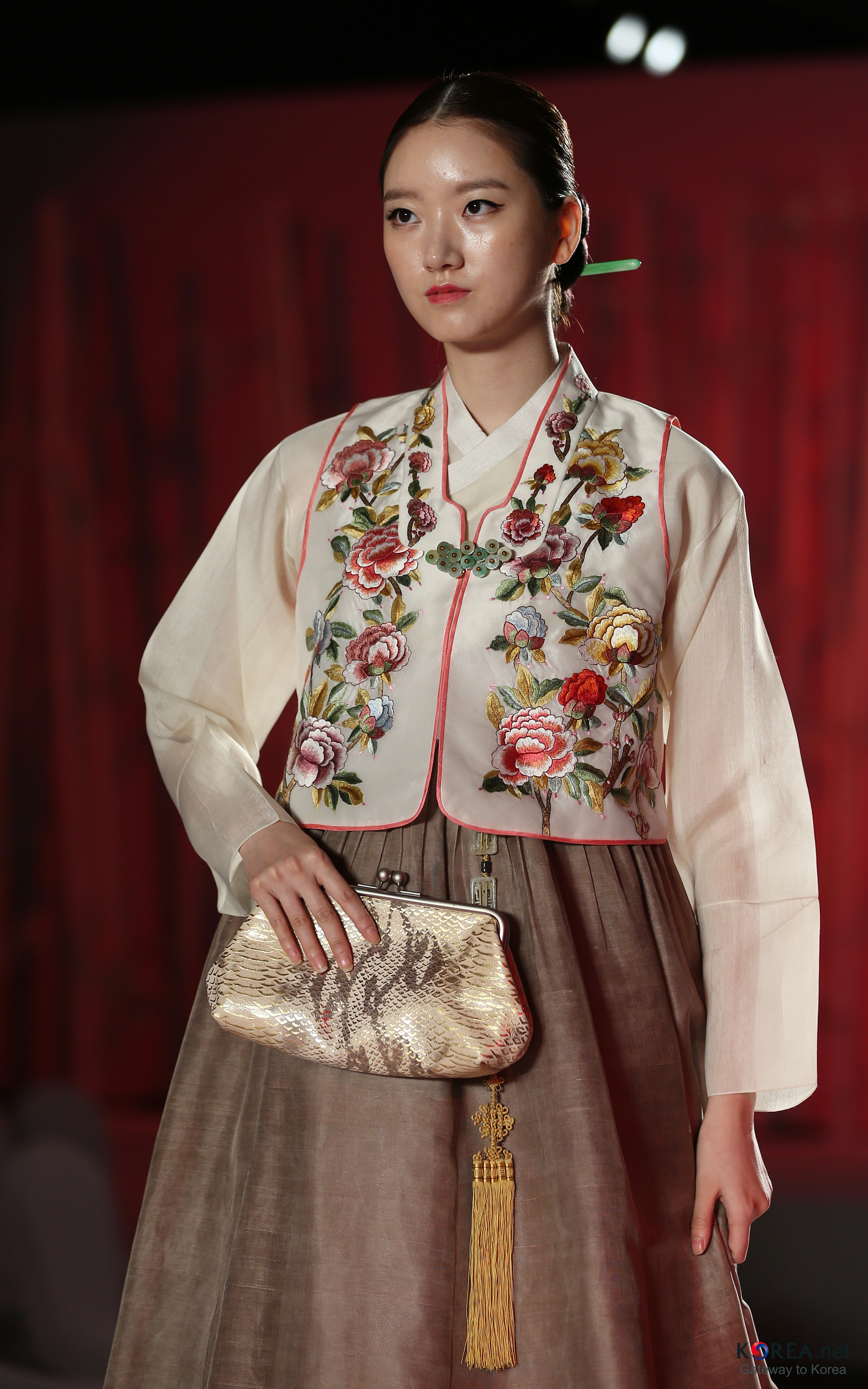
- Woman wearing baeja over her jeogori

Korean name
- Hangul: 배자
- Hanja: 褙子/背子
- RR: baeja
- MR: paeja

Baeja (/ˈbeɪʒə/ BAY-zhə; Korean: 배자; Hanja: 褙子) is a type of traditional Korean vest which is worn over the jeogori by both men and women. It is generally sleeveless; however some baeja may have short sleeves. It was worn during the Joseon period and continues to be worn in present days. During the Joseon period, some forms of baeja (such as the ones used in the jeokui) were also introduced from China's Ming dynasty as bestowed clothing to the royal family.

== Construction and design ==
Baeja came be square collared or round collared and has a frontal closure, called habim, instead of having a overlapping closure. It also has a detachable collar band called dongjeong. It is closed with a round or knotted button at the bottom of the collar band. The front and back shoulders are sewn together; however the sides are completely open or there is a long side-slit below the armpit. During the mid-Joseon, baeja with short sleeves were worn but were eventually replaced by the sleeveless style in the late 18th century.

== Usage ==
Baeja was used in winter by both men and women to stay warm; baeja made of thinner fabric were also used in spring and fall by women. In the late Joseon, the baeja was generally considered as a form of overgarment.

In the Pyongyang region, a fur lined baeja called teoldeunggeori or teolbaeja, widely worn by women in winter after the 1945's liberation from Japan; and it continues to be worn in present day.

== Joseon Period ==
During the Joseon period, the Baeja was usually paired with loose-fitting pants to complete the traditional Korean outfit. The Baeja's unique style and design have made it a popular choice for those looking for a traditional yet fashionable look. It was often embroidered and had patches, and the natural colors were utilized to create a distinctive look.

During the late Joseon dynasty in Korea, the Baeja was not only a popular attire worn by men and women, but it was also used as a military outfit. One of the unique features of the Baeja was its versatility. Unlike other traditional Korean clothing, the Baeja was designed to be creative without regard to status or rules. This made it an ideal piece of clothing for any occasion, whether formal or informal. As a result, the Baeja became a very diverse item, leading to many interpretations. Its flexibility allowed people to wear it in different ways, using different fabrics and colors to create unique and personalized styles. The Baeja's popularity continued even after the Joseon dynasty, and it remains an iconic piece of Korean clothing to this day.

== Modern Interpretations ==
The Baeja, a traditional Korean clothing item, has undergone a significant transformation in recent years to keep up with the ever-evolving fashion trends. To modernize the Baeja, several designers have infused it with contemporary elements, while others have created entirely new garments inspired by this traditional piece. It is also available in a wide variety of colors and styles to suit different preferences. Koreans have always been known for their penchant for modernizing traditional wear, and the Baeja is no exception. Some designers have incorporated traditional art into their Baeja designs to showcase the rich history and cultural heritage of Korea. Others have taken a different approach and added a touch of glamour to the Baeja, with bedazzled versions that are perfect for modern contexts. The Baeja has undergone a remarkable transformation, and it is now a versatile clothing item that caters to contemporary fashion trends while still maintaining its traditional roots.

In recent years, the Baeja has seen a resurgence in popularity, especially among K-pop groups like Oh My Girl, who use this modernized version of the Hanbok for their performances. Through their music and fashion, these groups promote their Korean heritage and showcase the Baeja's versatility and adaptability to modern fashion trends. This has helped to keep the Baeja alive as a vital part of Korean cultural identity and fashion.

== Similar-looking items ==
- Banbi
- Bijia

== See also ==
- Hanbok
- Jeogori
