= Liu Guandao =

Chinese court artist

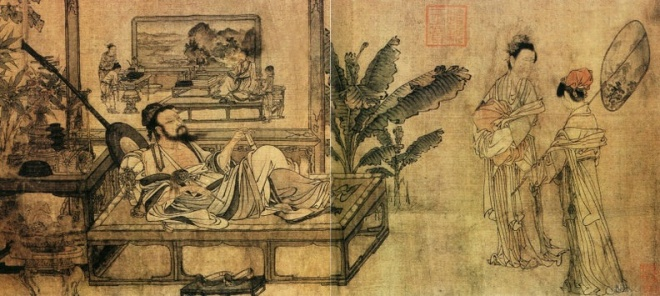
Whiling Away the Summer, handscroll, ink and colours on silk, 30.5 x 71.1 cm, Nelson-Atkins Museum of Art

Liu Guandao or Liu Kuan-tao (simplified Chinese: 刘贯道; traditional Chinese: 劉貫道; pinyin: Liú Guàndào; c. 1258 – 1336), courtesy name Zhong Xian (仲贤), was a Chinese court artist active during the Yuan dynasty. A native of Zhongshan (now Dingxian), Hebei, much of his work is in a realist style, and in 1279 he rose to prominence with a well-received painting of Kublai Khan's son Zhenjin.

== Career ==
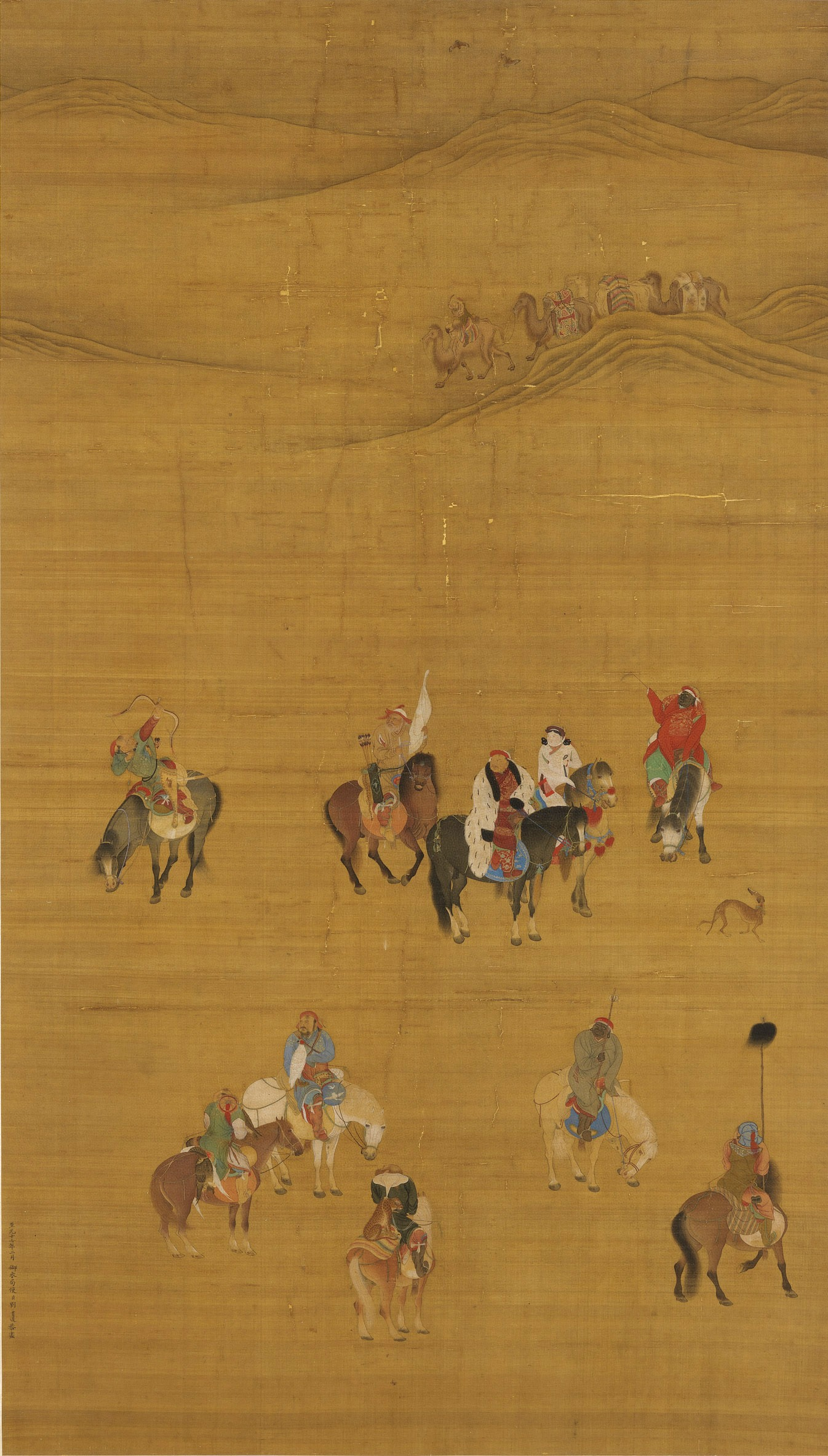
Kublai Khan Hunting (1280), hanging scroll, ink and colours on silk, 182.9 x 104.1 cm, National Palace Museum

Liu Guandao was born around 1258 in Zhongshan (now Dingxian), Hebei. Excelling in realism, he was said to be a self-taught painter and worked as one of the "very few" court artists at the Yuan court. In 1279, Liu was praised for his painting of Emperor Kublai Khan's son Zhenjin and was promoted to "Commissioner of the Imperial Wardrobe Bureau"; a year later, he was commissioned by Kublai to produce a painting of Kublai on a hunting expedition in the Gobi Desert; the painting, Kublai Khan Hunting, features Kublai, Empress Chabi, and a few servants, amidst "a barren scene of loess ... and a few hills". One of Liu's more famous works, Kublai Khan Hunting is housed in the National Palace Museum in Taipei, Taiwan. The museum writes of the painting, "the figures are meticulously rendered and the animals are all life-like in a naturalistic scene". Liu's depiction of Kublai Khan also confirms Marco Polo's account of the ruler as an "aging and obese man".

A hand scroll titled Whiling Away the Summer was erroneously believed to be a Song-era work by Liu Songnian until 1935, when its owner Wu Hufan discovered "a tiny signature" belonging to Liu Guandao. Whiling Away the Summer is described as unorthodox, and not characteristic of typical Yuan artworks. In Whiling, Liu "developed comparable designs, playing repeated straight lines off of crisp angles and fluid curves." Liu Guandao also painted a number of landscapes in the style of Guo Xi. Snow Landscape is attributed to Liu but is dated 1349, which is after his death in 1336. Liu is described as an "eclectic who studied a variety of old styles and combined their best points". A profile of Liu Guandao by the New York art gallery Kaikodo hails his figure painting as "truly the brushwork of an immortal".
