= Dapho =

Korean short sleeve or no sleeve garment

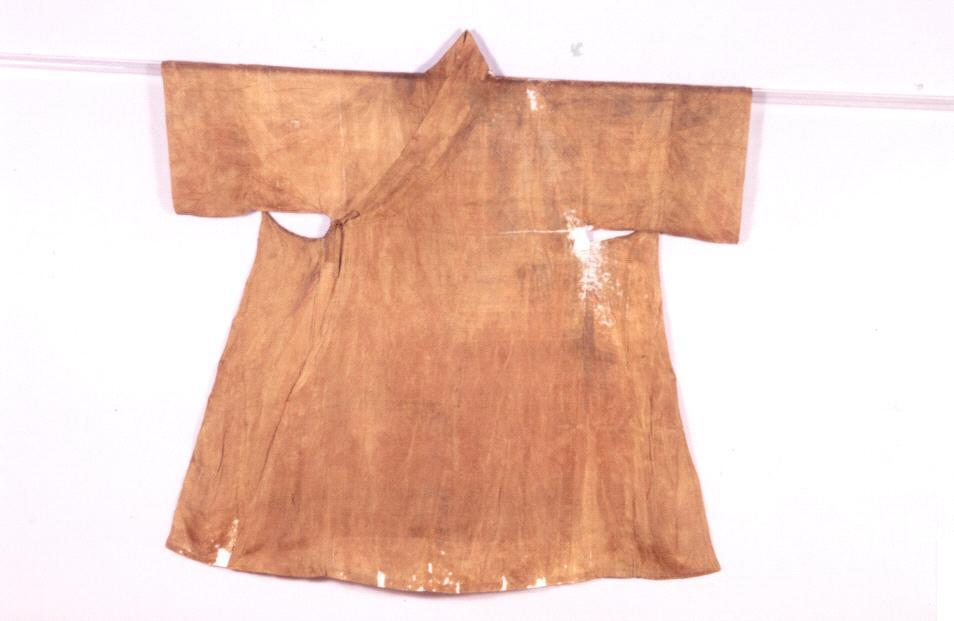
- Dapho with half-sleeves

Korean name
- Hangul: 답호
- Hanja: 褡護, 褡穫
- RR: dapho
- MR: tapho

Dapho (Korean: 답호), also known as dapbok or dapo, is either a sleeveless or short sleeved garment (banbi ui, 半臂 衣), The dapo originated in the Yuan dynasty and was introduced in Korea during the late Goryeo. With time the structure of the dapho changed in shape structure although it maintained the same name. Some form of dapho was introduced from China's Ming dynasty in the form of dahu during the Joseon period, when the clothing was bestowed to various Joseon kings (e.g. under the reign of King Sejong). (Note: The translated English version wrote 'dopo'; however dopo is another kind of robe. The Korean version links to the page 'dapo')

== History and usage ==
The dapho was over robes from the late Goryeo to the late Joseon dynasty. During this period, the dapho was worn over the cheollik. The dapho was also worn together with the government's official's danryeong. The dapho is worn first followed by the danryeong.

The short sleeved dapho disappeared from the 1630s.

In the 17th century, the sleeveless dapho was worn over the cheollik by the Joseon kings and by civil and military officials. It was also used as a form as of jeonbok (戰服) since the middle of the Joseon period.

In the 18th century, the sleeveless dapho with side gores appeared for a while.

From the latter half of the 19th century, the sleeveless dapho which looked similar to the changui (a form of royal robe) in shape began to appear. In King Gojong era, the dapho was worn as a daily formal clothing along with the durumagi.

== Construction and design ==
The dapho has sewed sides and the back section of the garment is left opened below the waistline level.

== See also ==
- Dahu – A Chinese equivalent
- Po – General term for Korean outerwear
- Round collar robe
