= Dahu (clothing) =

Type of Chinese jacket

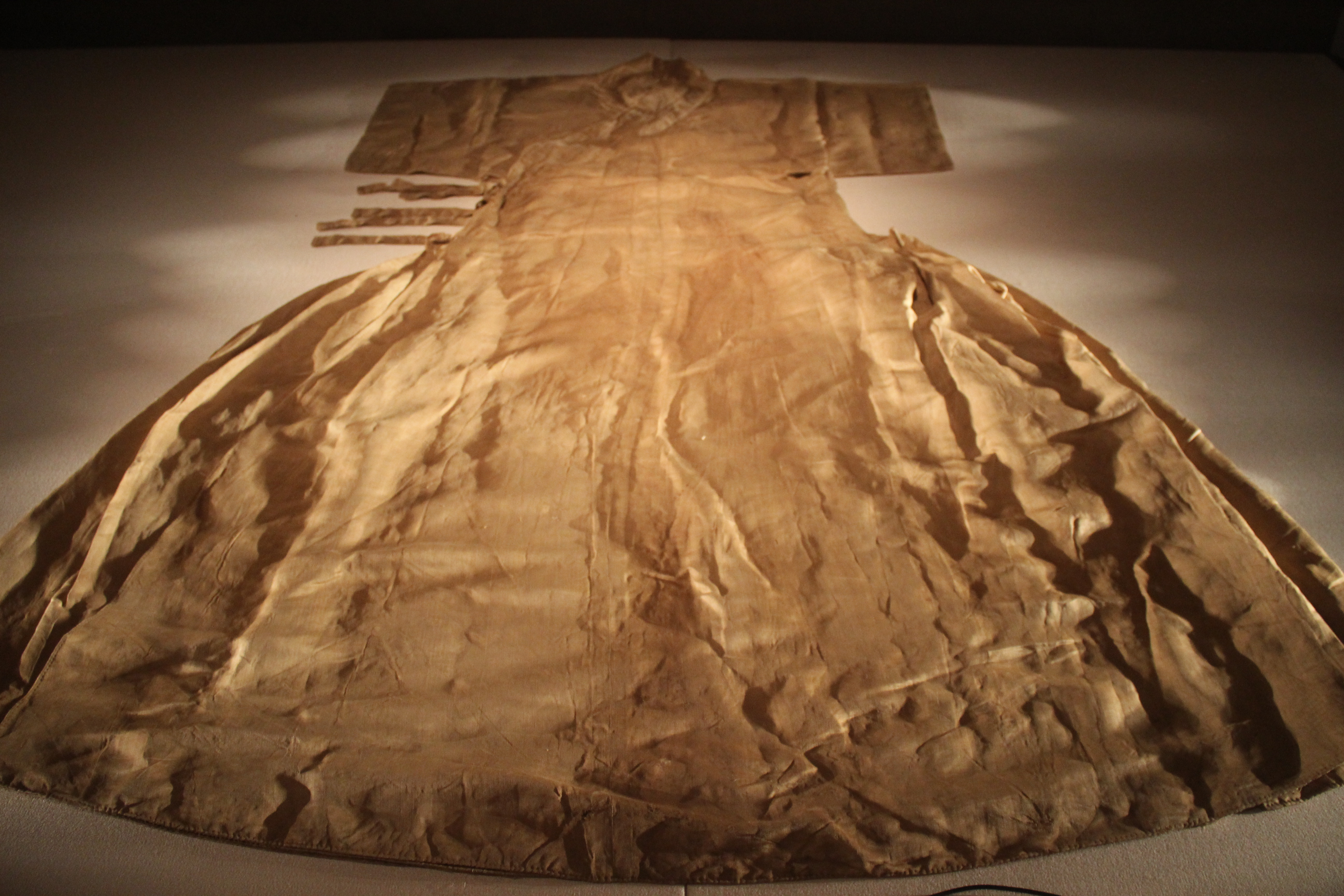
- Ming dynasty dahu, unearthed from the Tomb of Prince Zhu Tan.

Chinese name
- Traditional Chinese: 褡護
- Simplified Chinese: 褡护
Transcriptions
Standard Mandarin
- Hanyu Pinyin: Dāhù

Korean name
- Hangul: 답호
- Hanja: 褡護/褡穫
Transcriptions
- Revised Romanization: Dapho

Dahu (simplified Chinese: 褡护; traditional Chinese: 褡護; pinyin: Dāhù) was a form of robe/jacket which was used in the Ming dynasty. In Ming dynasty, the dahu was either a new type of banbi (半臂; 'half-arm') or a sleeveless jacket, whose designs was influenced by the Mongol Yuan dynasty clothing.

== History ==
=== Yuan dynasty ===
In the Yuan dynasty, banbi were also referred as dahu in a broad sense but could also refer to a specific type of banbi of the same name, which is a half-sleeved long robe (长袍; changpao) with a cross-collar closing to the right (交领右衽; jiaoling youren). This form of dahu (y-shaped collar long robe with short sleeves) was worn by the Mongols in the Yuan dynasty over long-sleeved robes in similar fashion as it was worn prior to the founding of the Yuan dynasty.

=== Ming dynasty ===
In the Ming dynasty, the dahu could be worn over the tieli robe and/or could be worn under the round-collar robe. Some forms of dahu was bestowed to the Joseon Kings; for example, in 1444 under the rule of King Sejong of Joseon, the Ming dynasty bestowed him dahu, along with cheollik and gollyeongpo. (Note: The translated English version wrote 'dopo'; however dopo is another kind of robe. The Korean version links to the page 'dapo'. Cheollik is the equivalent of the Chinese robe Tieli. Both the Korean cheollik and Chinese tieli are derivatives of the Yuan dynasty's terlig.) In the 21st century, the dahu, along with many forms of hanfu, was revived following the Hanfu movement.

== Construction and design ==
The dahu combined the features of the Tang and Song dynasties hanfu and the Mongol Yuan dynasty clothing. The dahu was a cross-collar jacket which wrapped on the right side; it could be either short-sleeves or no-sleeves.

== Gallery ==
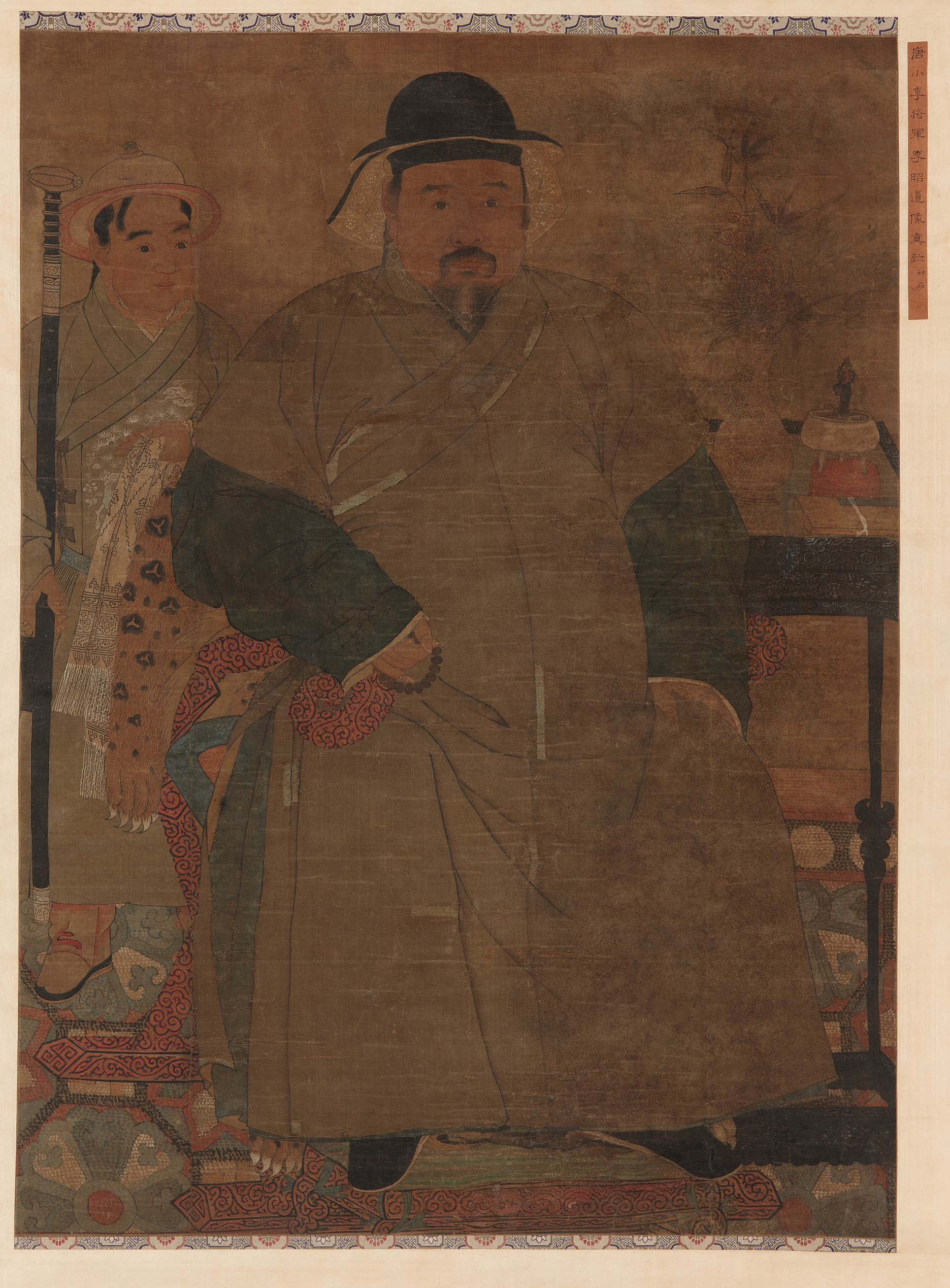
Portrait of a man wearing dahu and his servant, 17th century.

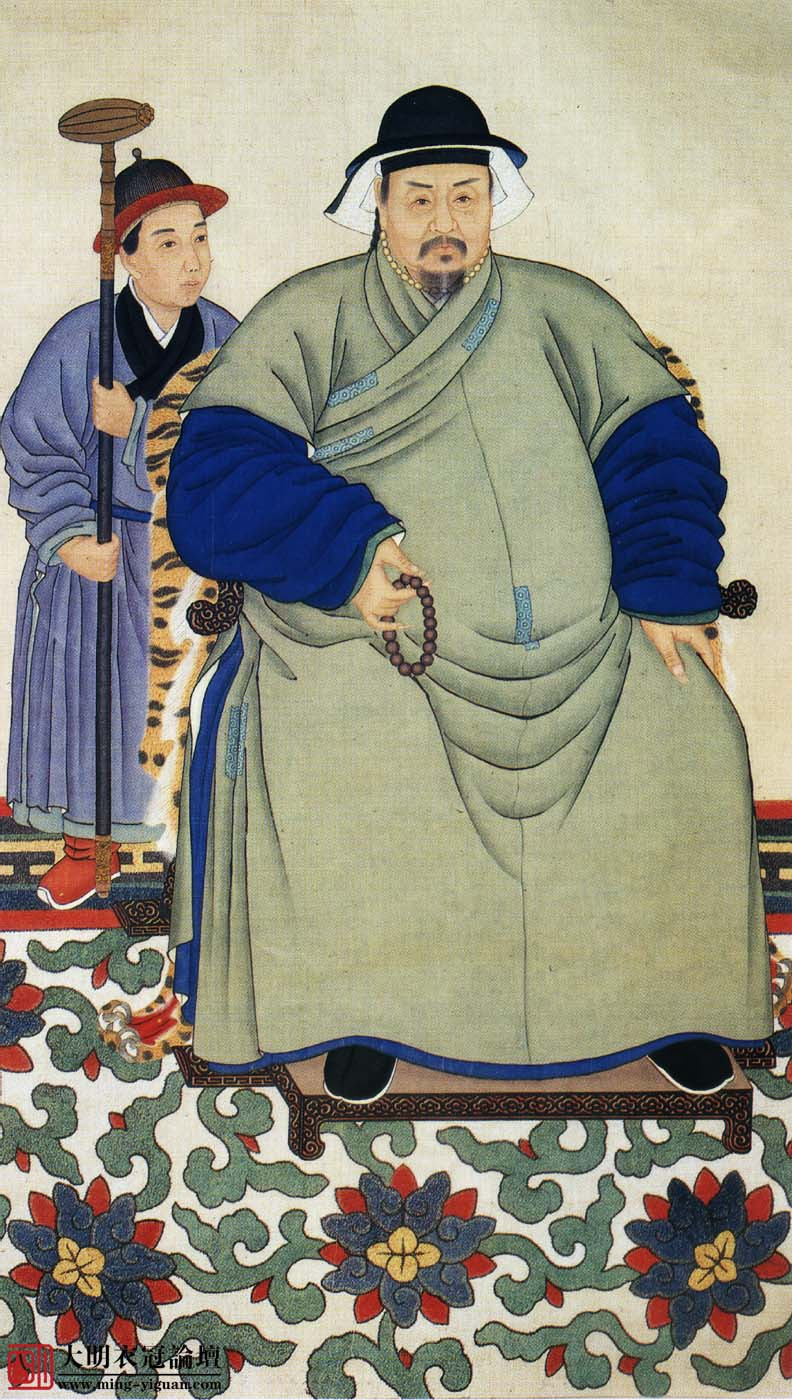
A man wearing a green dahu, a Ming dynasty painting.

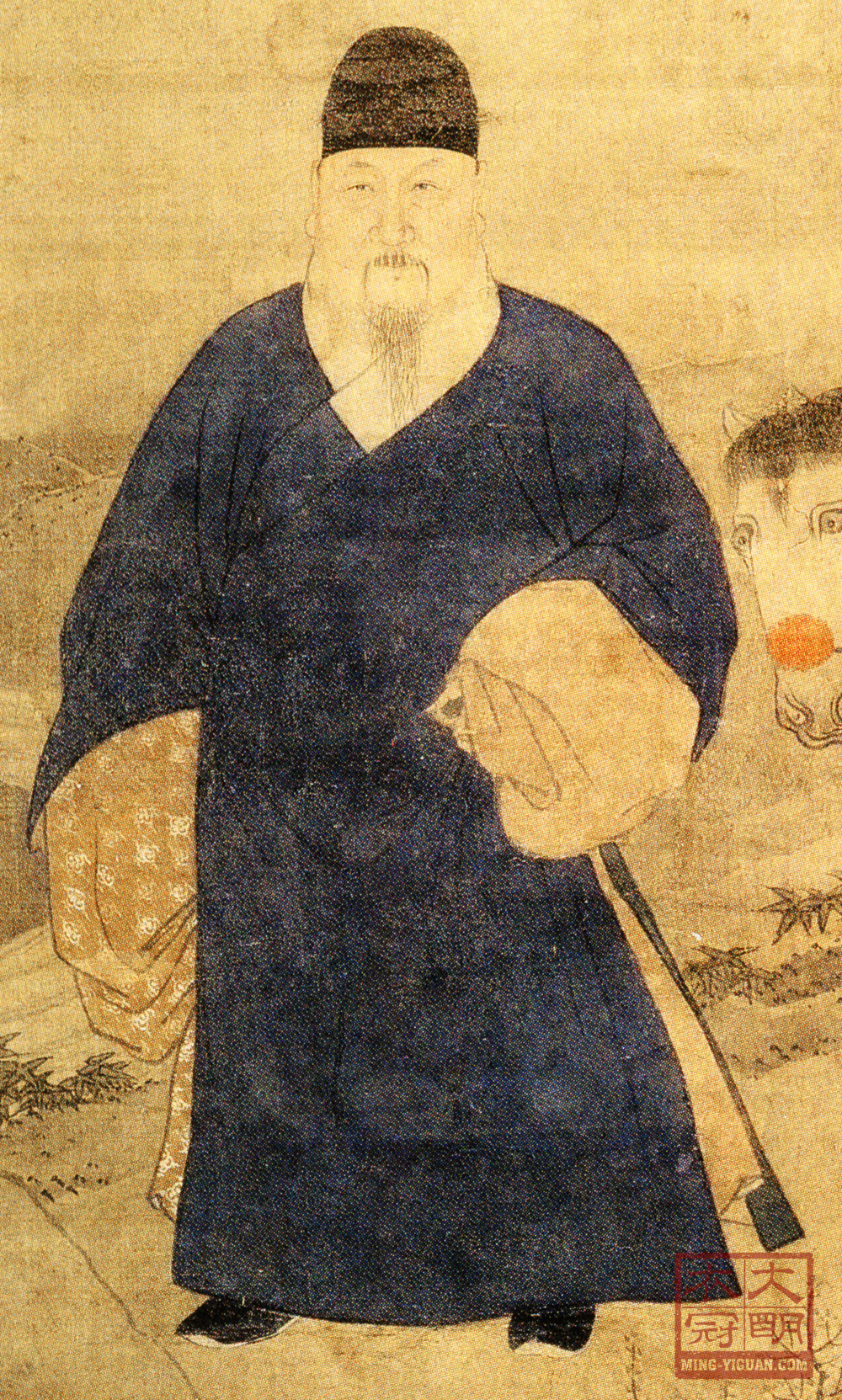
Man wearing dahu, Ming dynasty.

== Similar-looking garments ==
- Dapho – a Korean short sleeved overcoat.
- Banbi

== See also ==
- Fashion in Yuan dynasty
- Hanfu
- Terlig
