= Matiu Parakatone Tahu =

Matiu Parakatone Tahu (?–1863/64?) was a notable New Zealand tribal tohunga and mission teacher. Of Māori descent, he identified with the Ngāi Te Rangi iwi.
