= Beizi =

Chinese Clothing

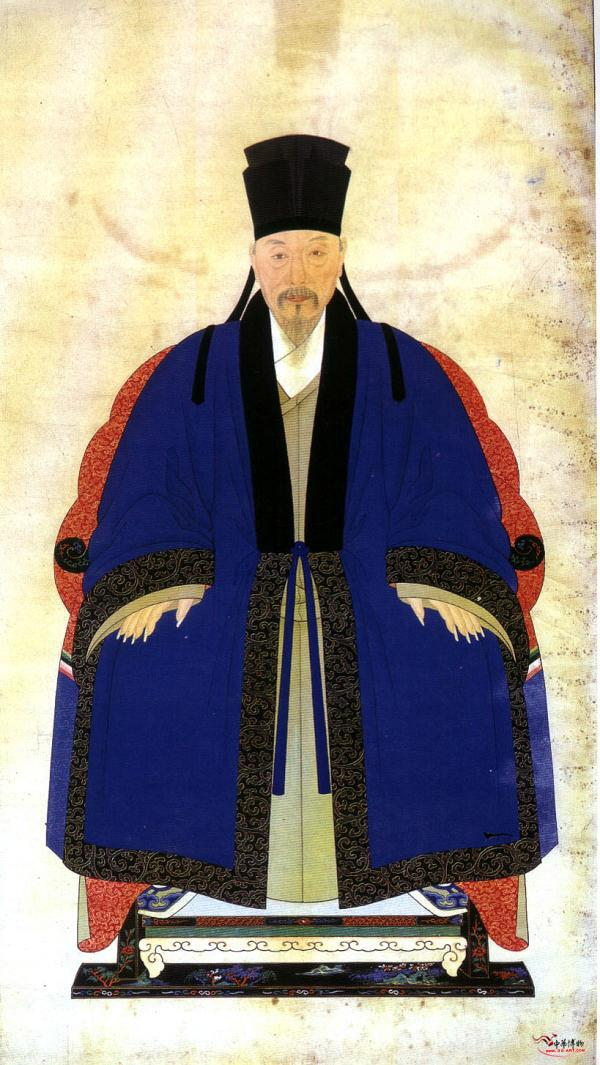
- Ming dynasty portrait of man wearing a "Ming Styled" beizi over zhiduo
- Chinese: 褙子
Transcriptions
Standard Mandarin
- Hanyu Pinyin: bèizi

Beizi (Chinese: 褙子; pinyin: bèizi), also known as beizi (Chinese: 背子; pinyin: bēizi) and chuozi (Chinese: 綽子; pinyin: chuòzi), is traditional Chinese attire commonly worn by both men and women; it is typically a large loose outer coat with loose and long sleeves. The beizi originated in the Song dynasty. It was most popular during the Song dynasty, Ming dynasty, and from the early Qing to the Mid-Qing dynasty. In the Ming dynasty, the beizi was called pī fēng (披風). When worn by men, it is sometimes referred as changyi (氅衣), hèchǎng (鹤氅; 'crane cloak'), or dachang (大氅) when it features large sleeves and knotted ties at the front as a garment closure.

== Terminology ==
Beizi (背子) translates literally to "person sitting behind". According to Zhu Xi, the beizi may have originated from clothing worn by concubines and maidservants, and it was named after these people as they would always walk behind their mistress.

== History ==
=== Origins ===
The beizi originated in the Song dynasty; it is assumed that it was derived from the banbi, where the sleeves and the garment lengthened. According to Ye Mende, the beizi was initially worn as a military clothing with half-sleeves; the sleeves were later extended and hanging ribbons were added from the armpits and back. According to both Zhu Xi and Lu You, beizi did not exist in earlier eras and only became popular in the Late Northern Song dynasty.

=== Song dynasty ===
In the Song dynasty, the beizi was worn by all social strata regardless of gender; however, it was a more prevalent in people of the higher social status. Emperor Zhezong and Emperor Huizong both wore yellow beizi, while the Grand Councillors of the Northern Song period would wear purple beizi with a round collar; this form of fashion remained until the Xuanhe period.

The beizi had a straight silhouette, and the Song dynasty people liked its elegance which reflect the cultural and psychological development of Song dynasty culture that valued simplicity. Zhu Xi also created some rules for dressing, which included the wearing of beizi by unmarried women and concubines. While women were allowed to wear beizi as a regular dress, men could only wear it in informal situation. The male Song dynasty beizi was worn as informal clothing at home because it could be left unfastened in the front due to the relaxed waistline. Examples of beizi artefacts worn by women dating from Song dynasty were unearthed from the tomb of Huang Sheng.

During the Song dynasty, the hèchǎng (鶴氅; 'crane cloak') was worn as a casual form of clothing by the recluse and retired officials; it could be worn over a zhiduo. Hechang were long and loose, and it could be made of down of crane and other birds, it was long enough for its lower hem to reach the ground.

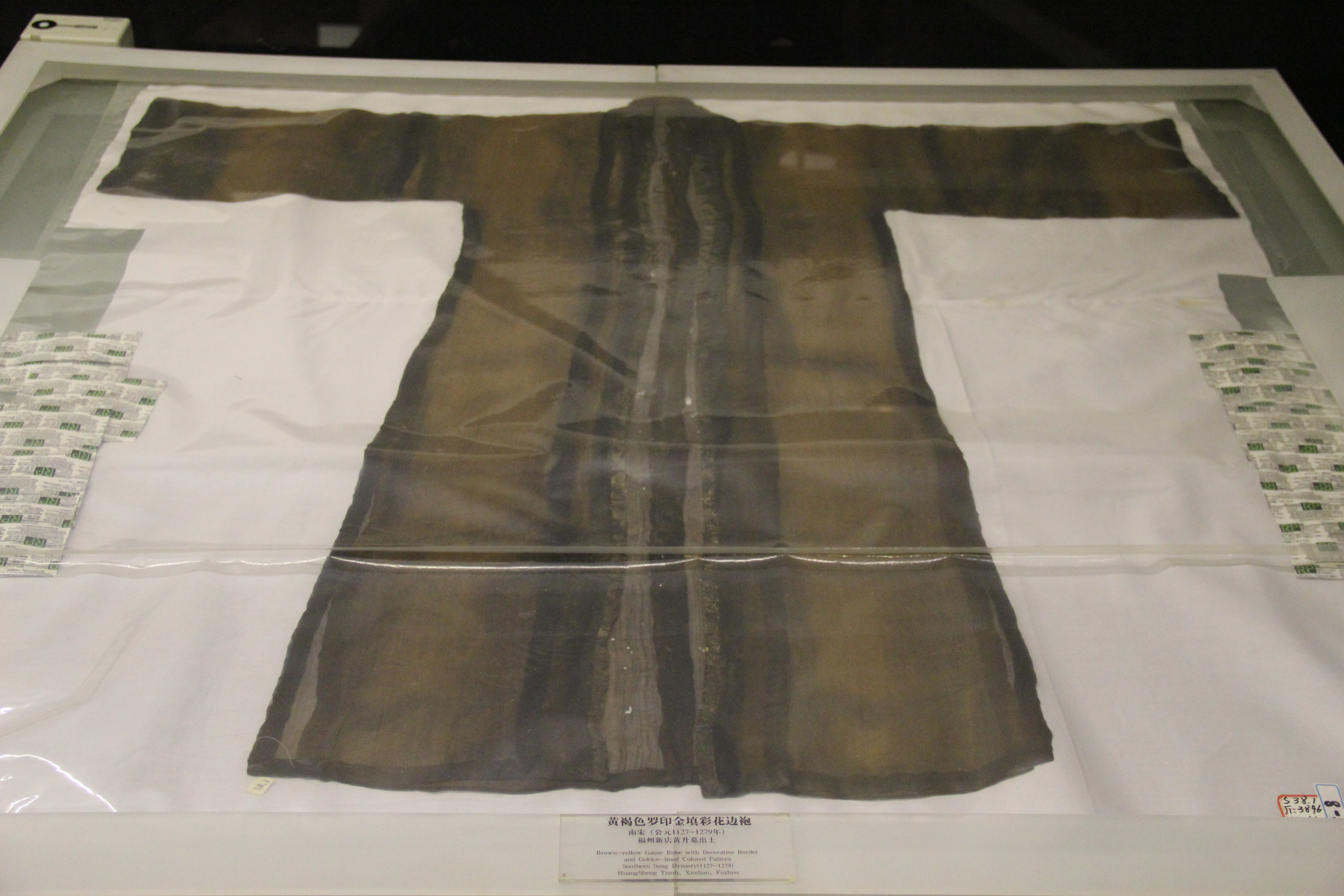
Unearthed beizi with narrow sleeves from the tomb of Huang Sheng, Southern Song dynasty.

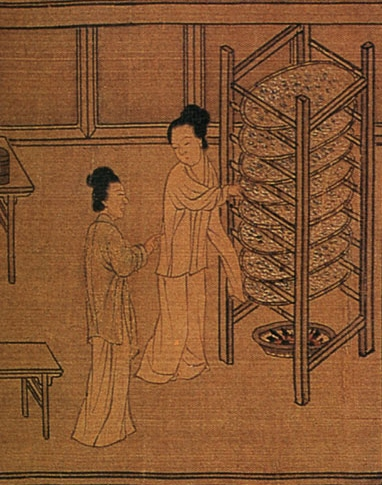
Commoner women wearing beizi, Song dynasty.

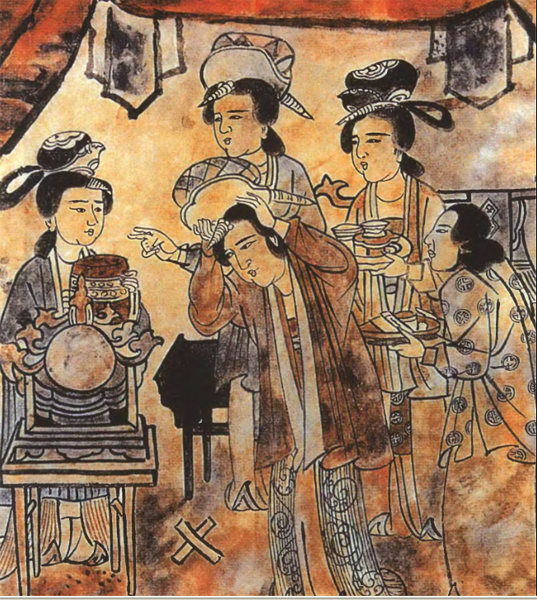
Song dynasty women wearing beizi (背子), Northern Song dynasty (960–1127 AD).

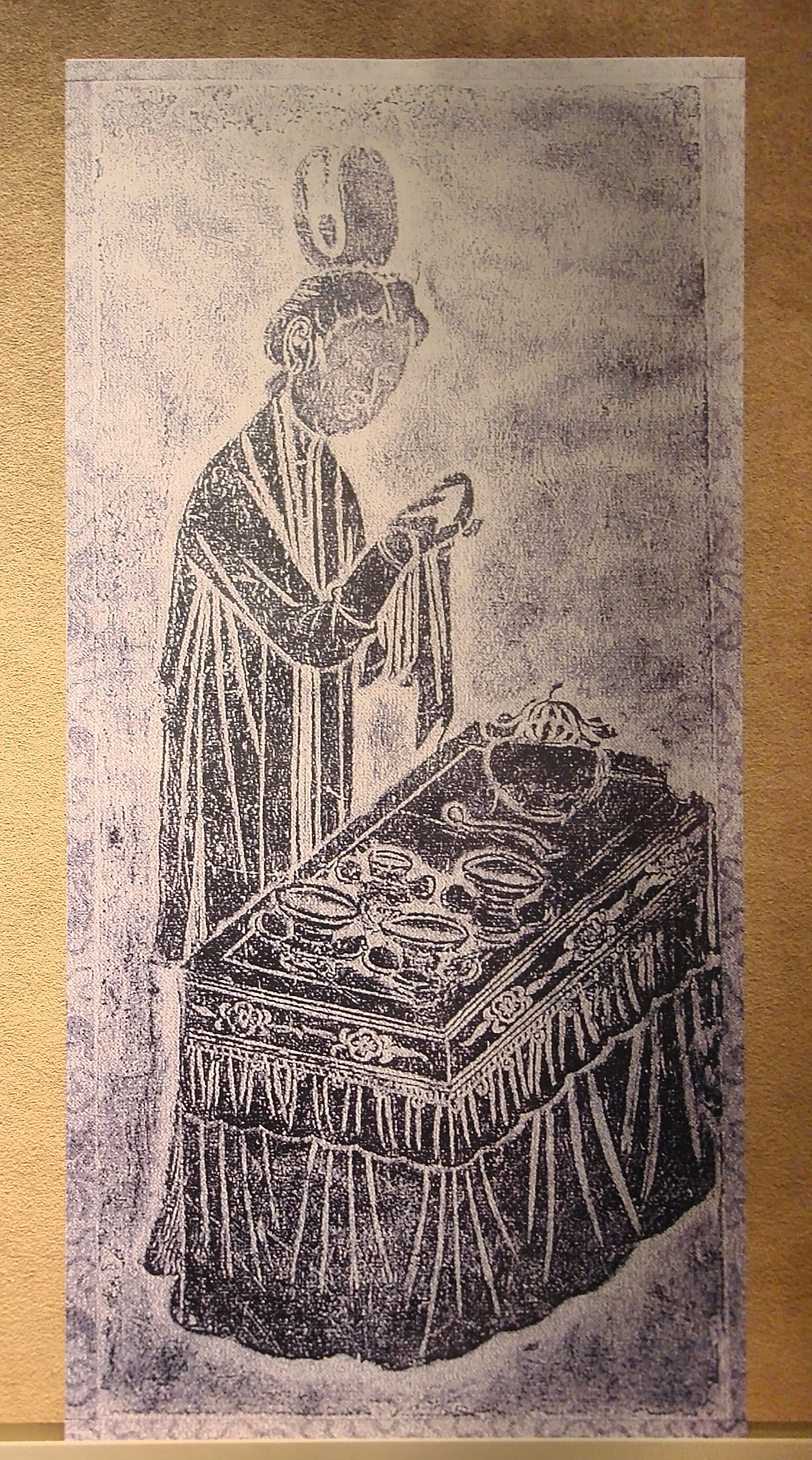
Song dynasty relief of a woman wearing a beizi.

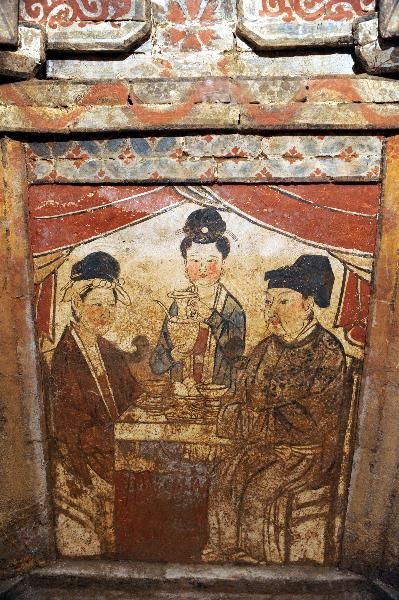
Women wearing beizi, Song dynasty Tomb Painting Found in Tengfeng City.

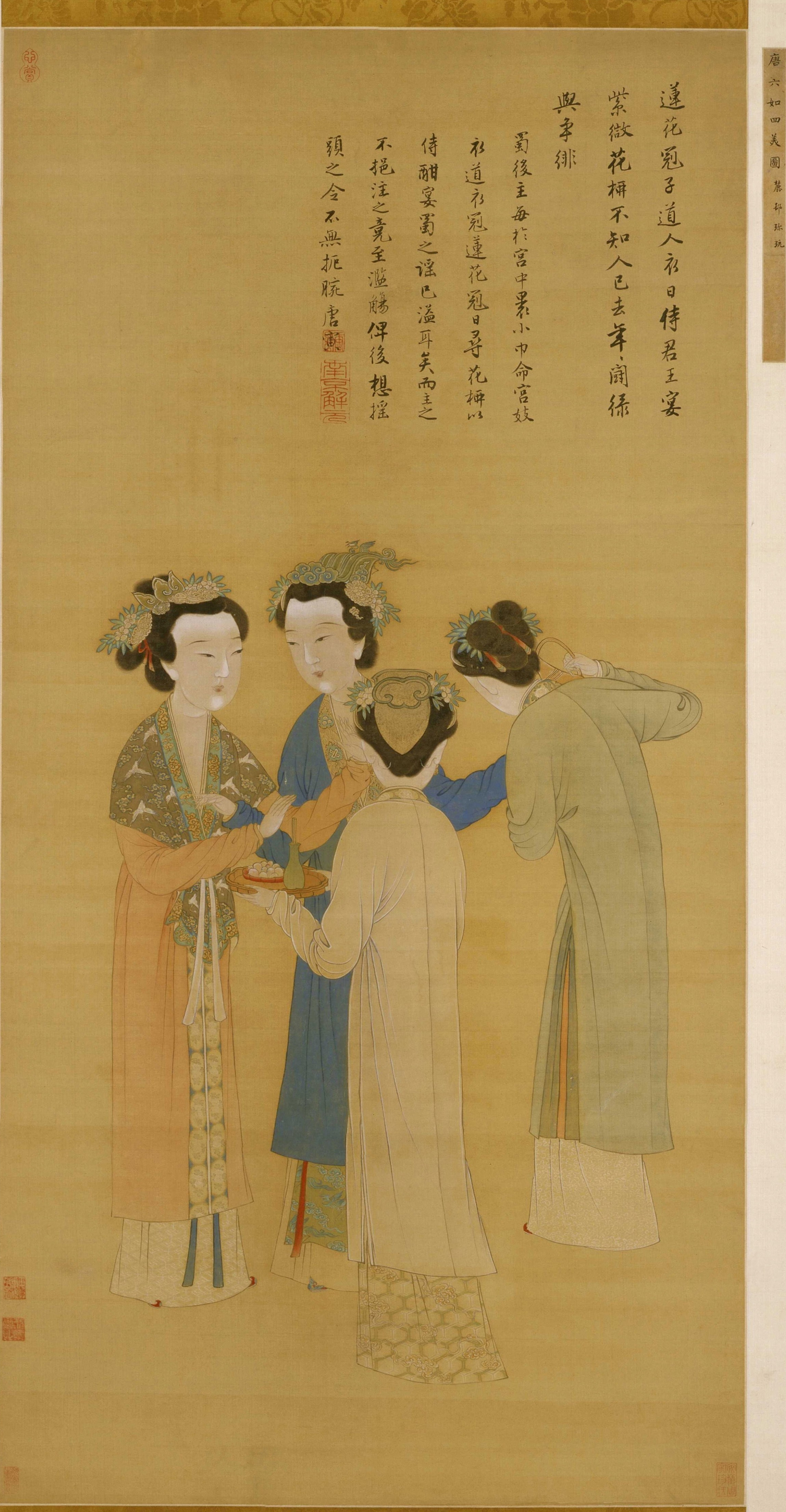
Court Ladies of the Former Shu wearing post-Tang Style beizi.

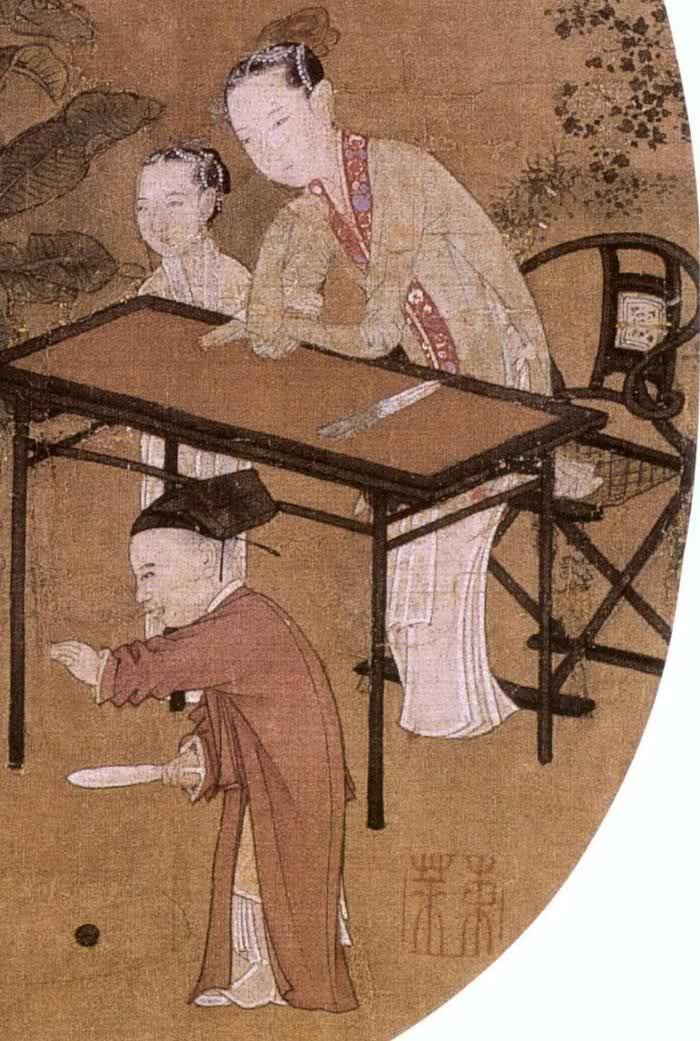
Song dynasty beizi, 12th century.

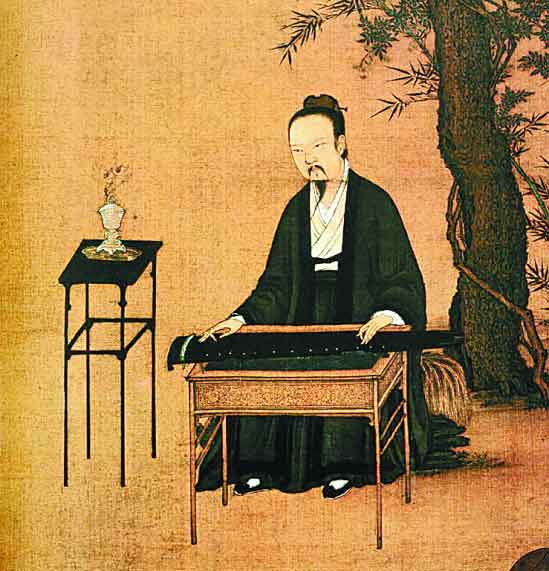
A man wearing a "Song Style" beizi, or hechang (鶴氅).

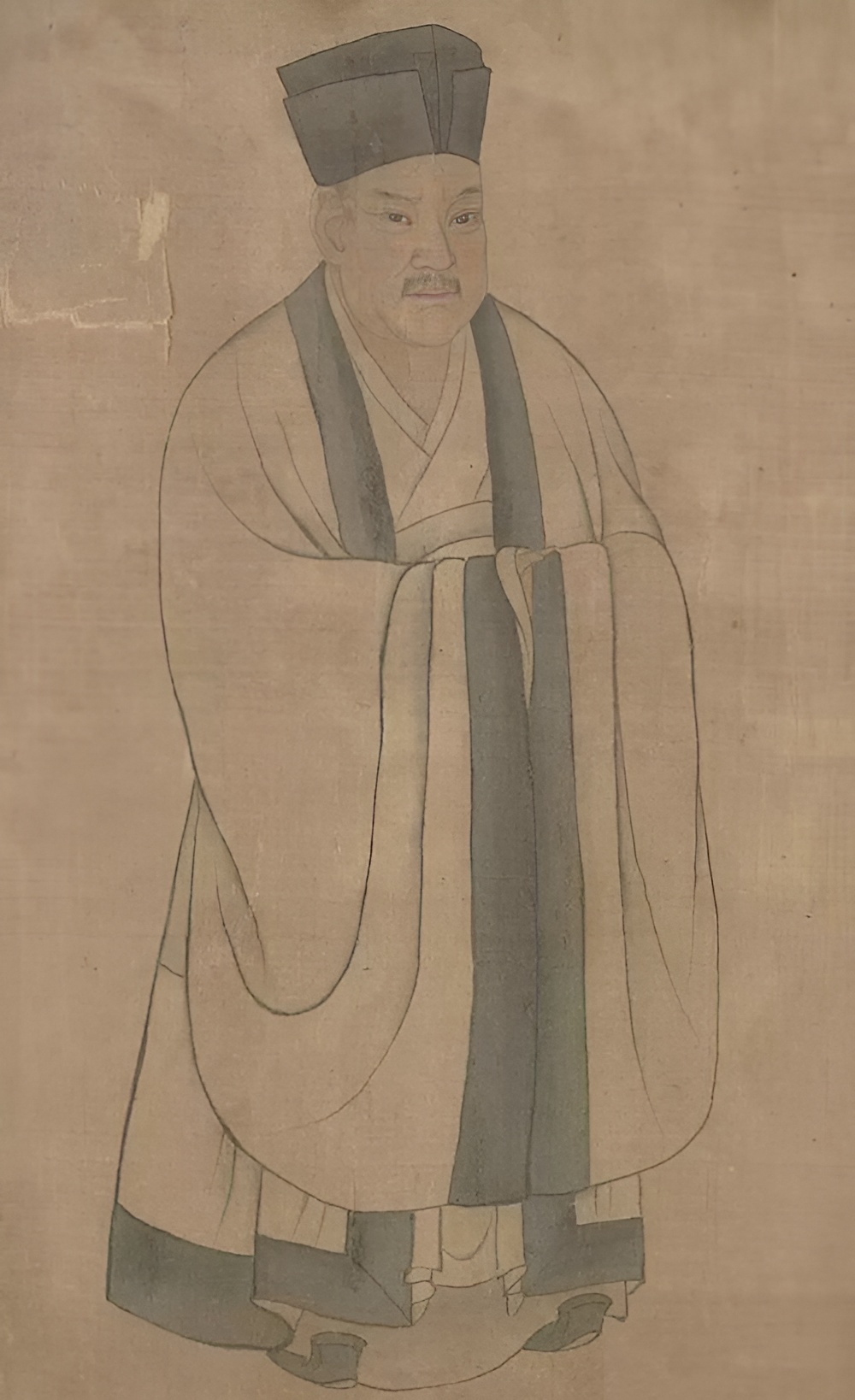
A man wearing a hechang.

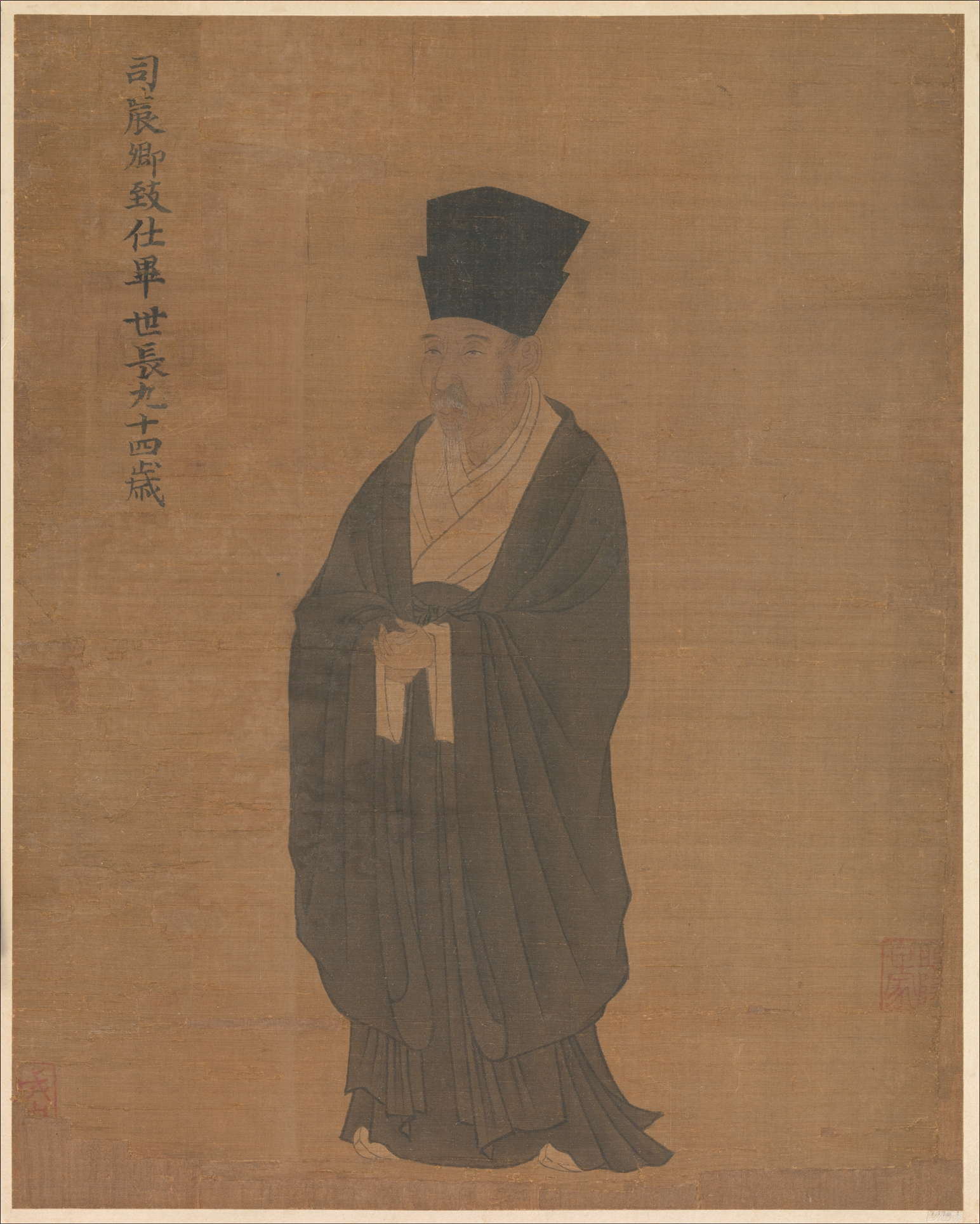
Portrait of Bi Shichang wearing hechang.

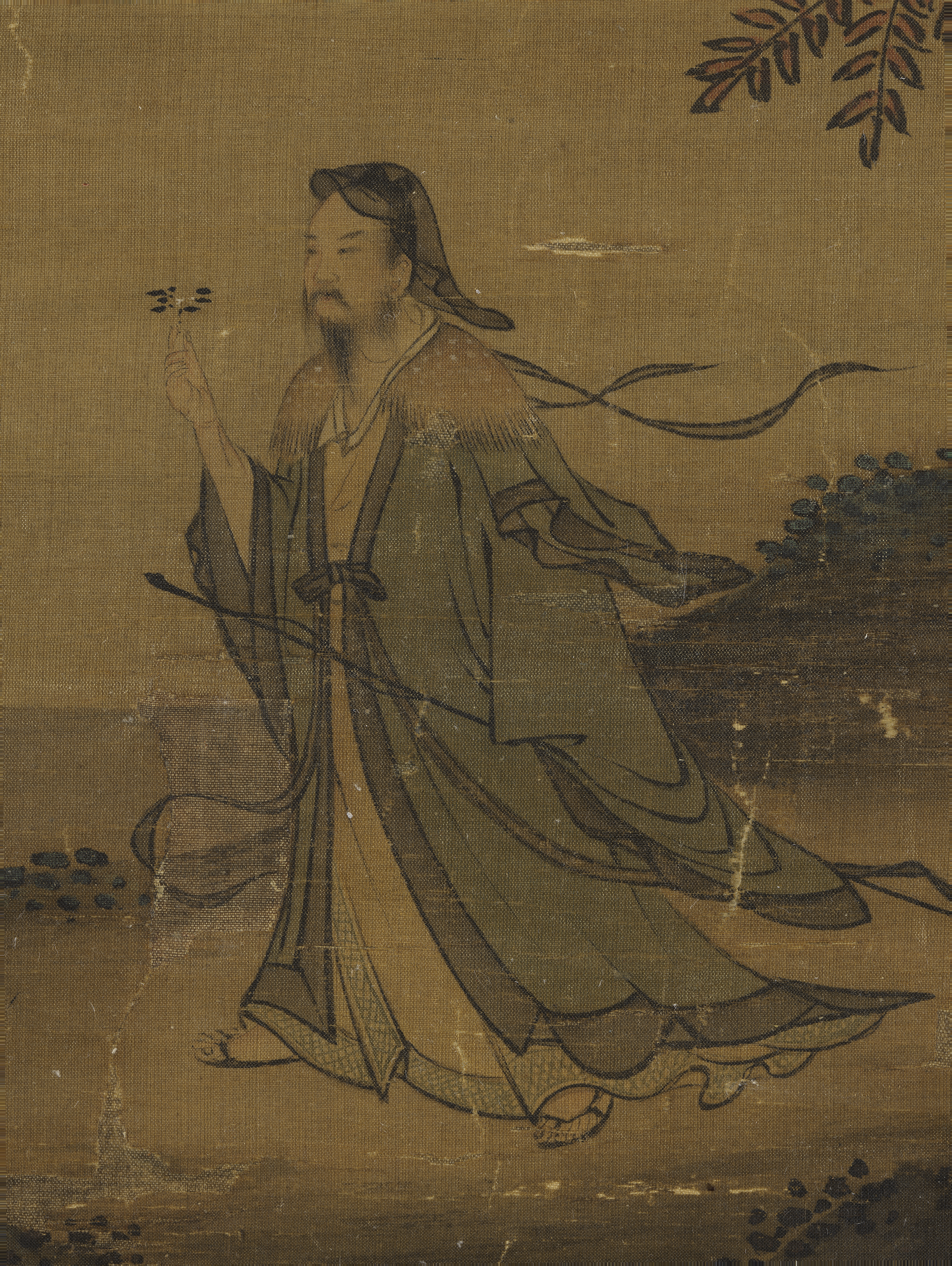
Painting of a scholar wearing fur-lined hechang.

=== Ming dynasty ===
Women's pifeng became so long by the 16th century that it caused some anxieties to government officials as the women's pifeng started to look closer to the men's clothing. Traditionally, women's upper garments stopped at her waist, being covered with a lower garment in order to represent "earth supporting heaven". It was perceived as a confusion between man and woman, as men who traditionally had their upper garments covering their lower garments to symbolize "heaven embracing earth".

The pifeng was a prominent clothing for women in the late Ming dynasty as a daily dress in the 16th and 17th century.

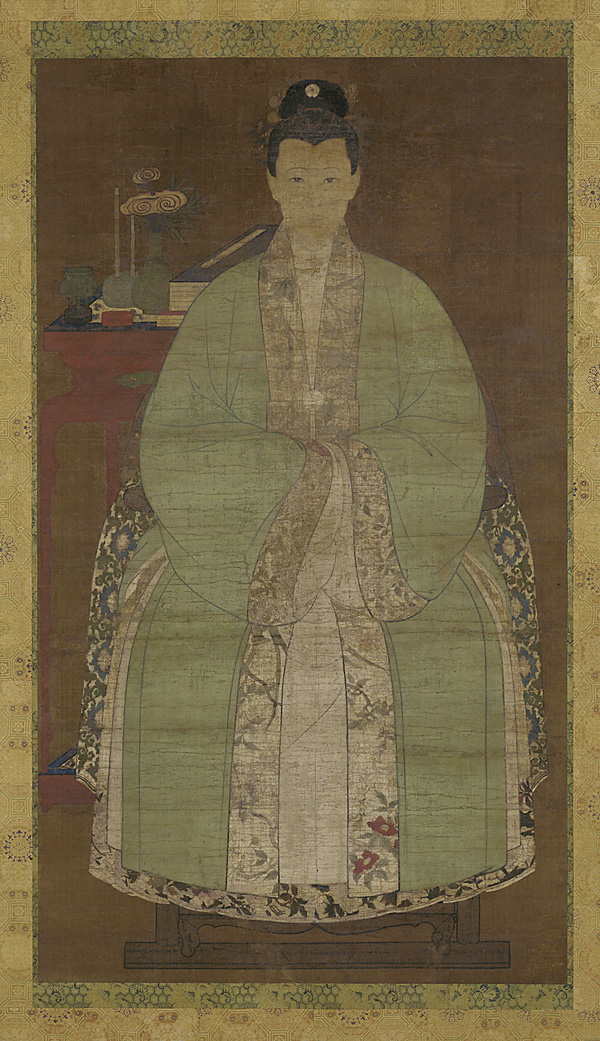
Ming dynasty portrait of a Woman wearing a "Ming Styled" beizi (also known as pifeng).

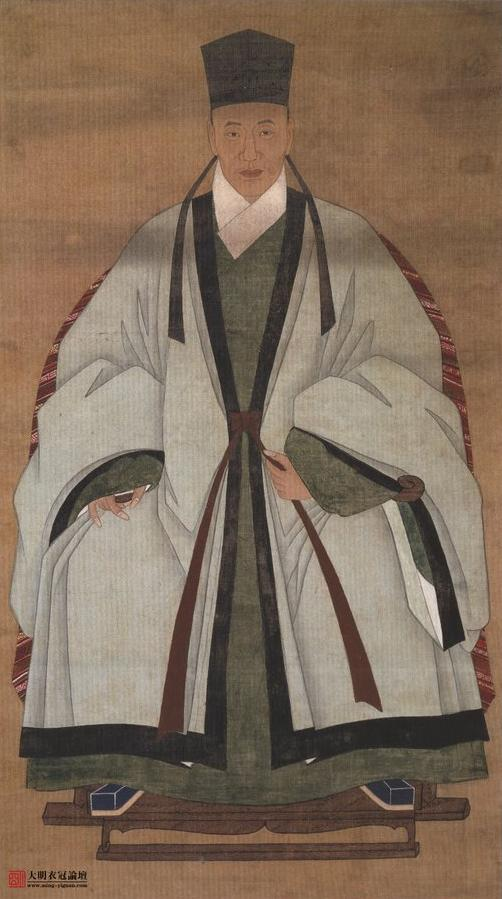
Ming dynasty portrait of a man wearing a "Ming Styled" beizi.

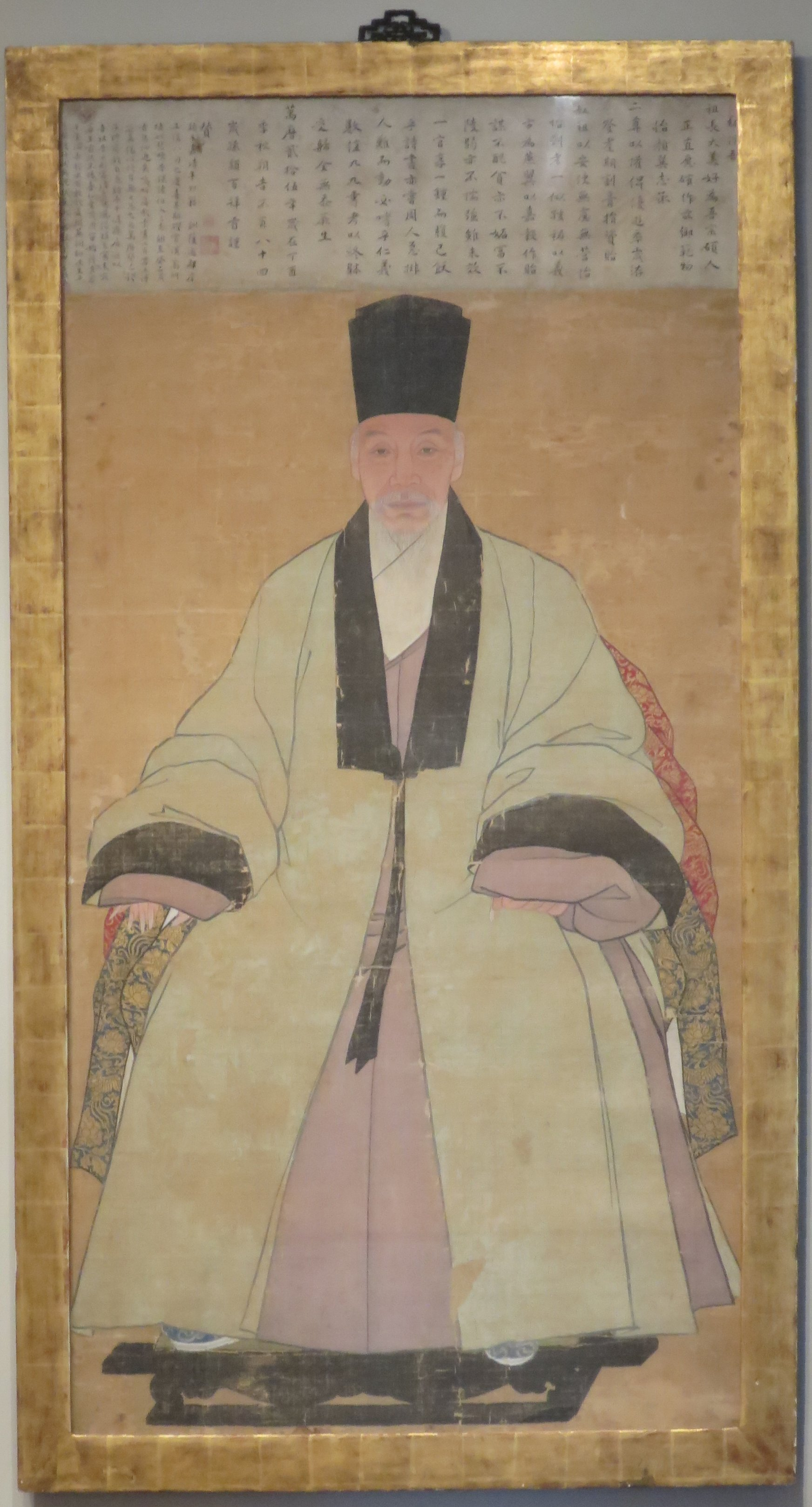
Men wearing beizi, Ming dynasty, 16th century

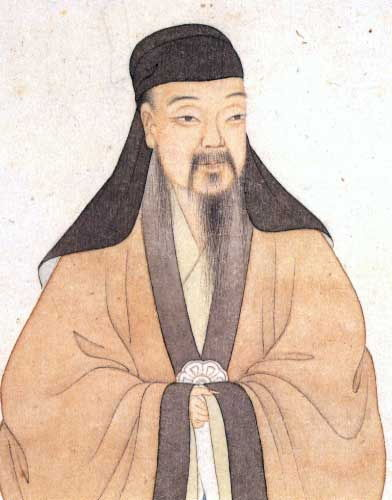
A Ming Portrait of Tang Xianzu wearing "Ming styled" beizi

=== Qing dynasty ===
During the Qing dynasty, the Ming-style form of clothing remained dominant for Han Chinese women; this included the beizi. In the 17th and 18th century AD, the beizi was one of the most common clothing and fashion worn by women in Qing dynasty, along with the ruqun, yunjian, taozi and bijia. The pifeng continued to be worn even after the fall of the Qing dynasty, but eventually disappeared by the 19th century.

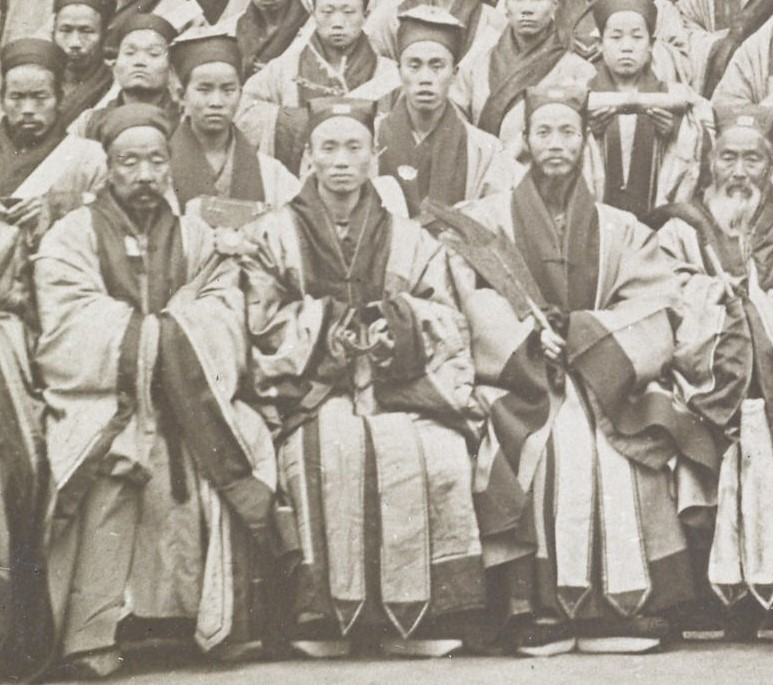
Taoist priests of Baxian Temple wearing hechang, 1910-1911.

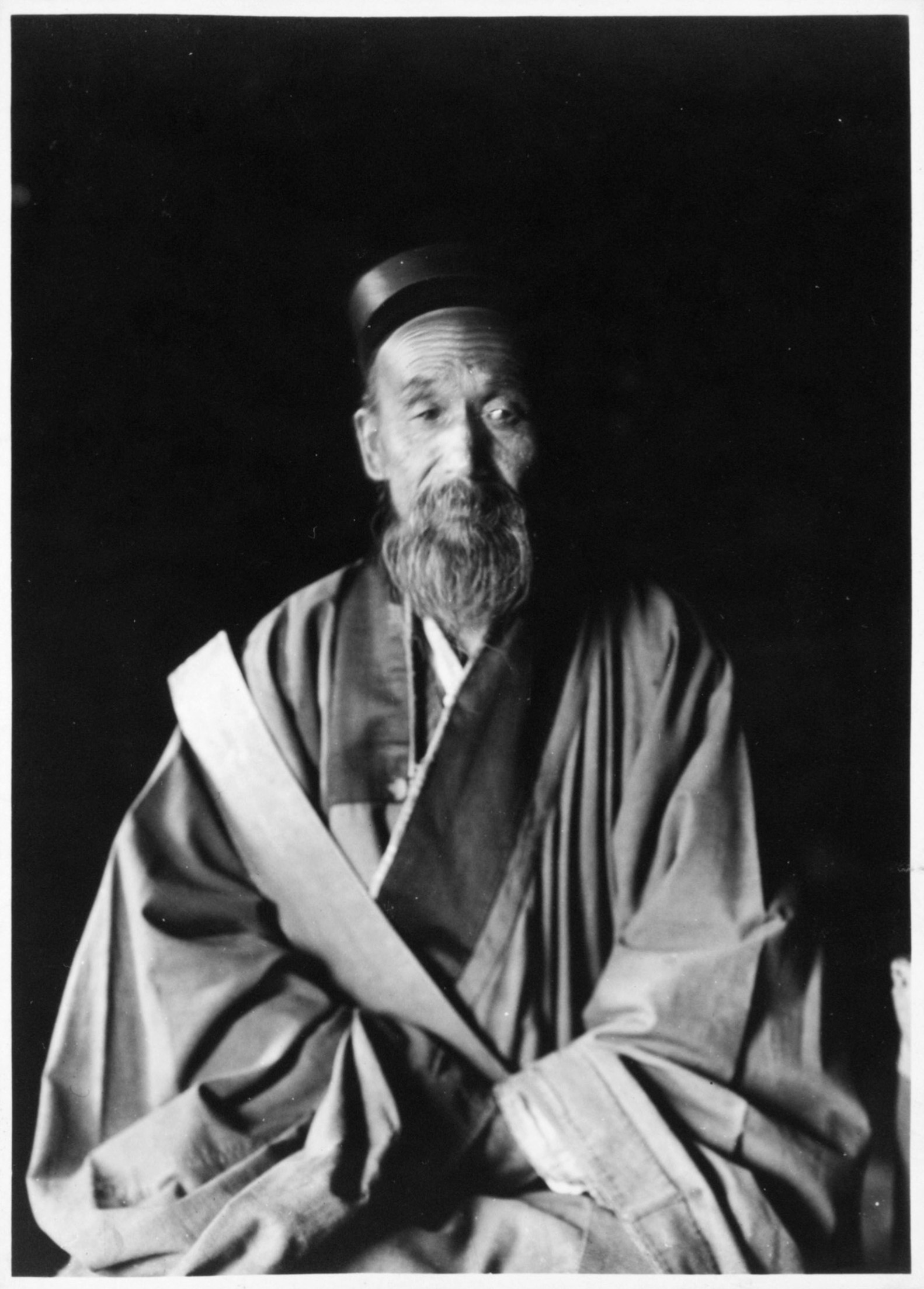
Taoist Priest wearing hechang and daopao, 1931.

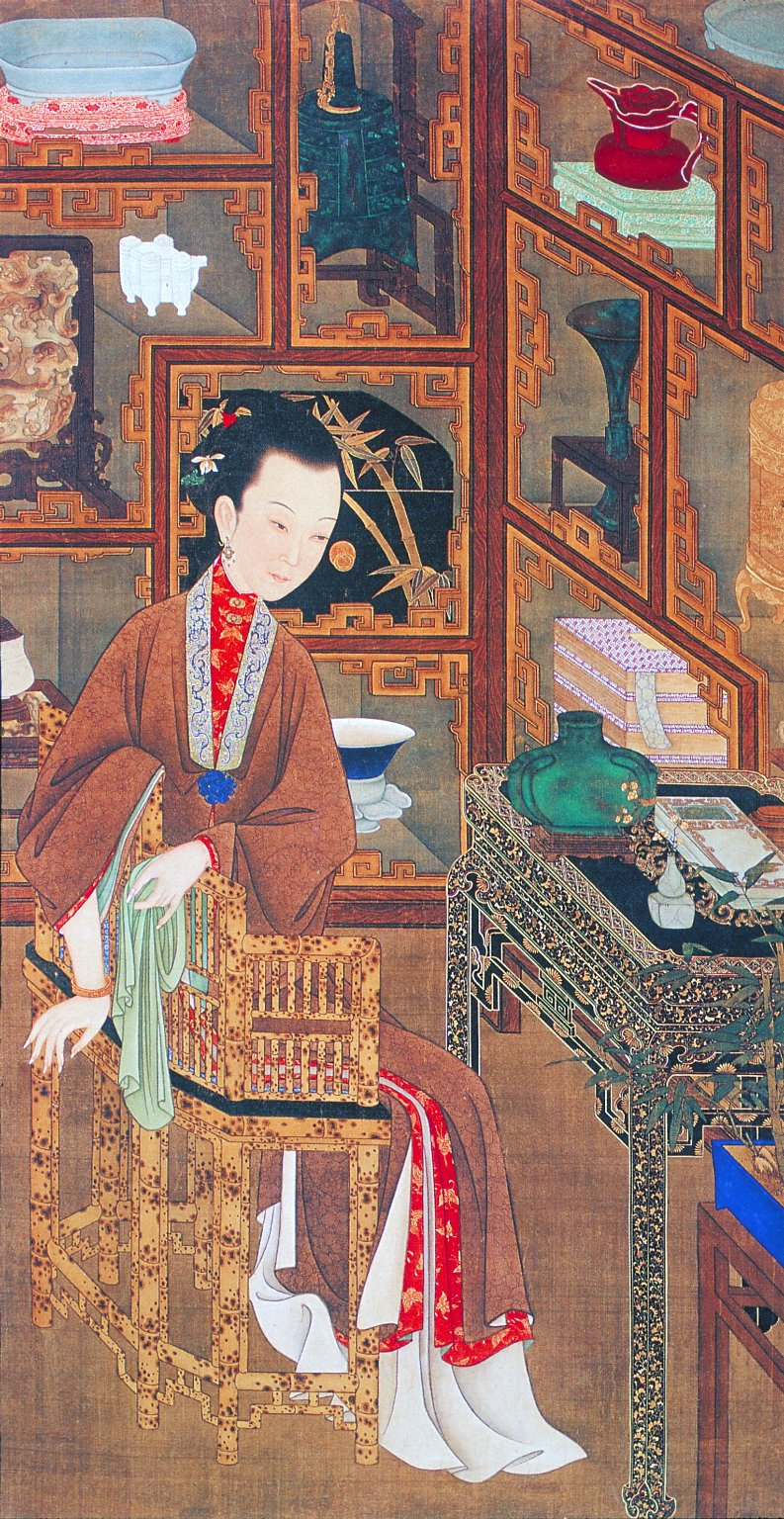
Qing dynasty beizi, illustration d. before 1732 AD

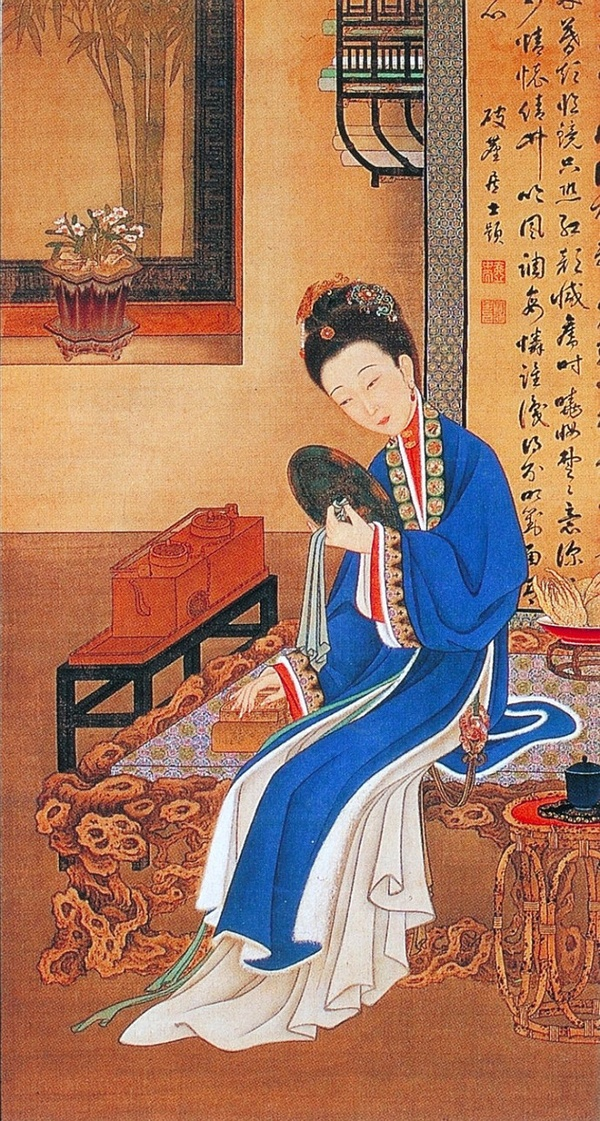
Qing dynasty beizi, illustration d. before 1732 AD

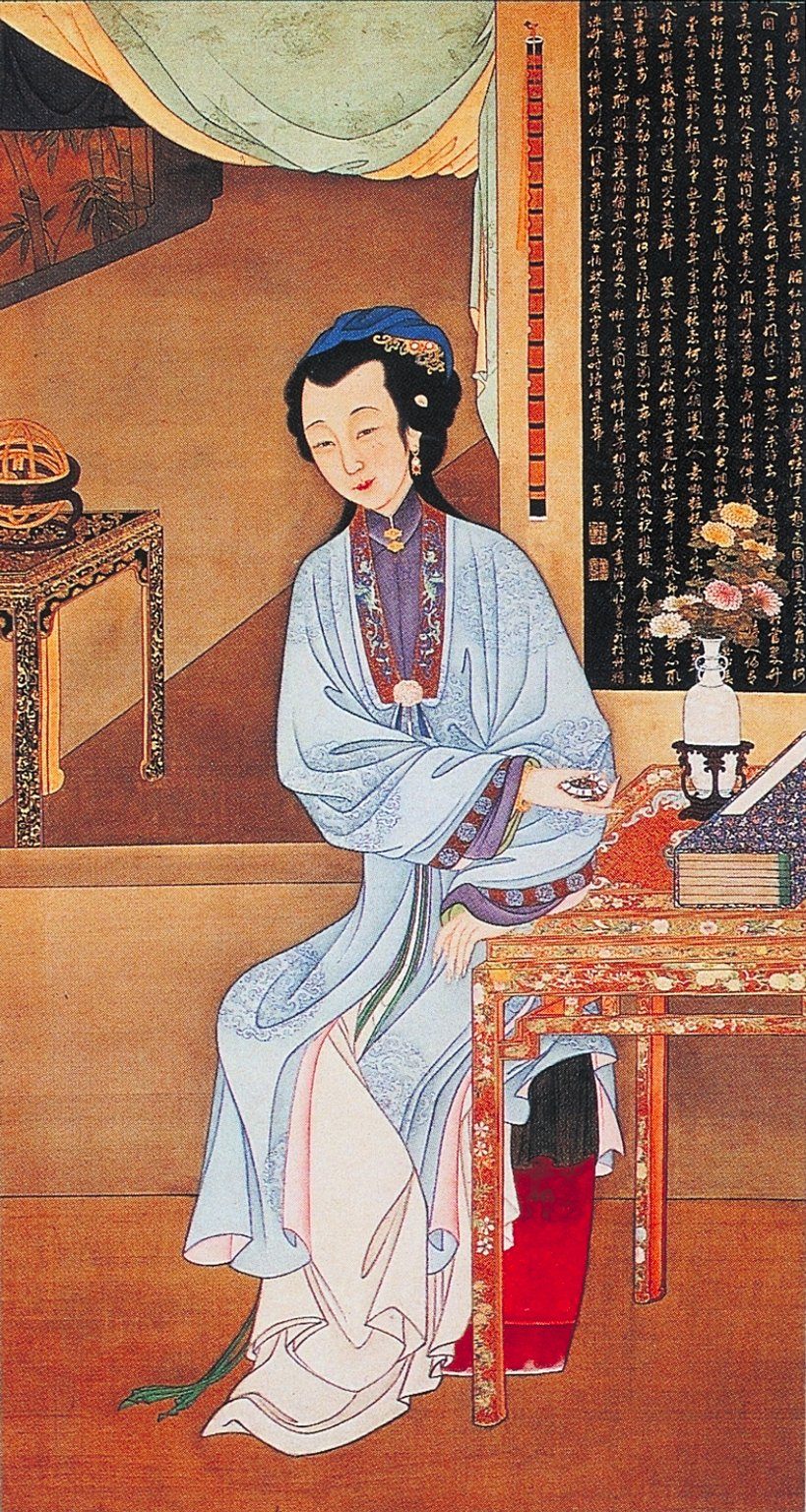
Qing dynasty beizi, illustration d. before 1732 AD

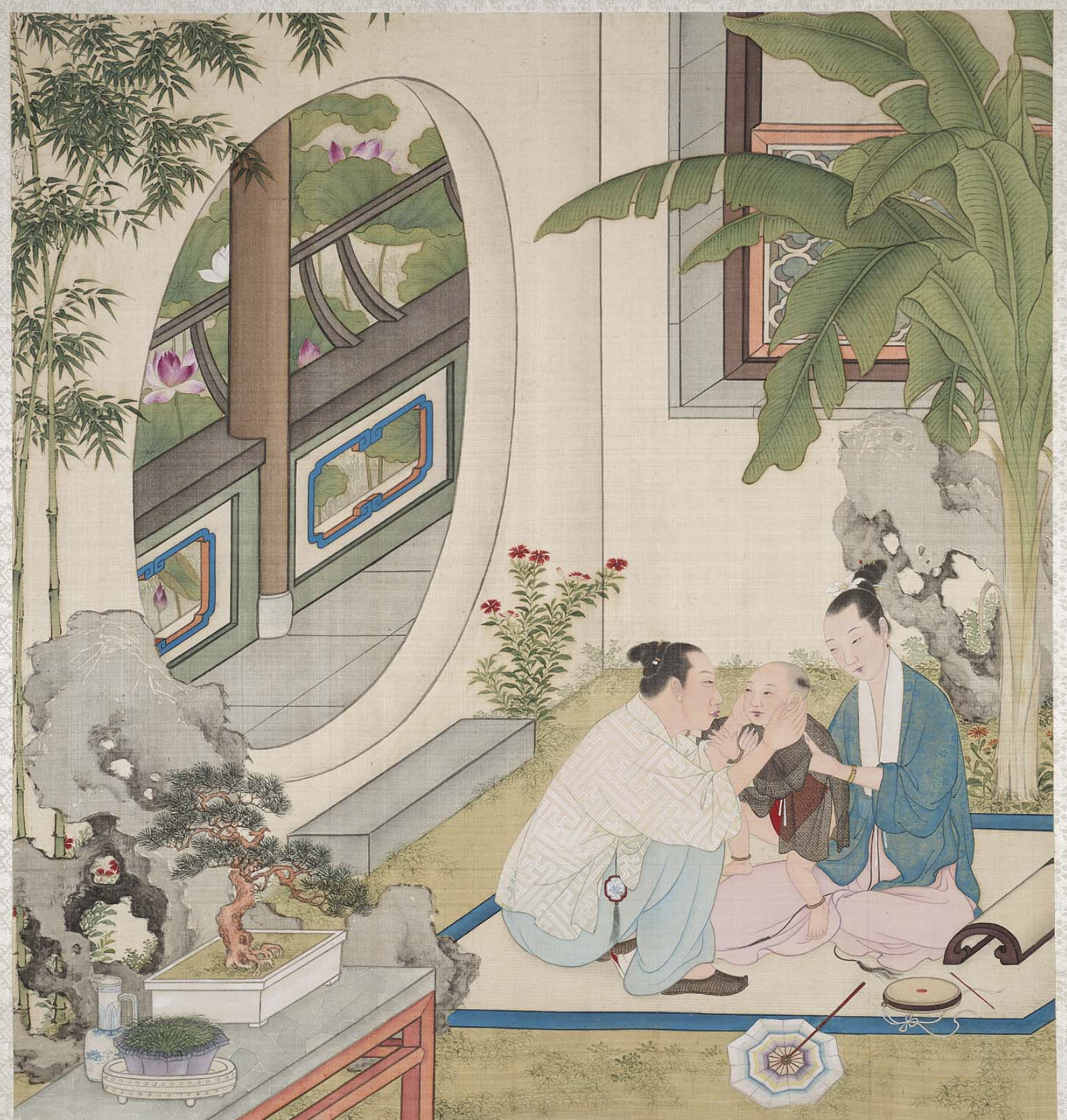
Woman wearing beizi, Domestic Scene from an Opulent Household, Qianlong period.

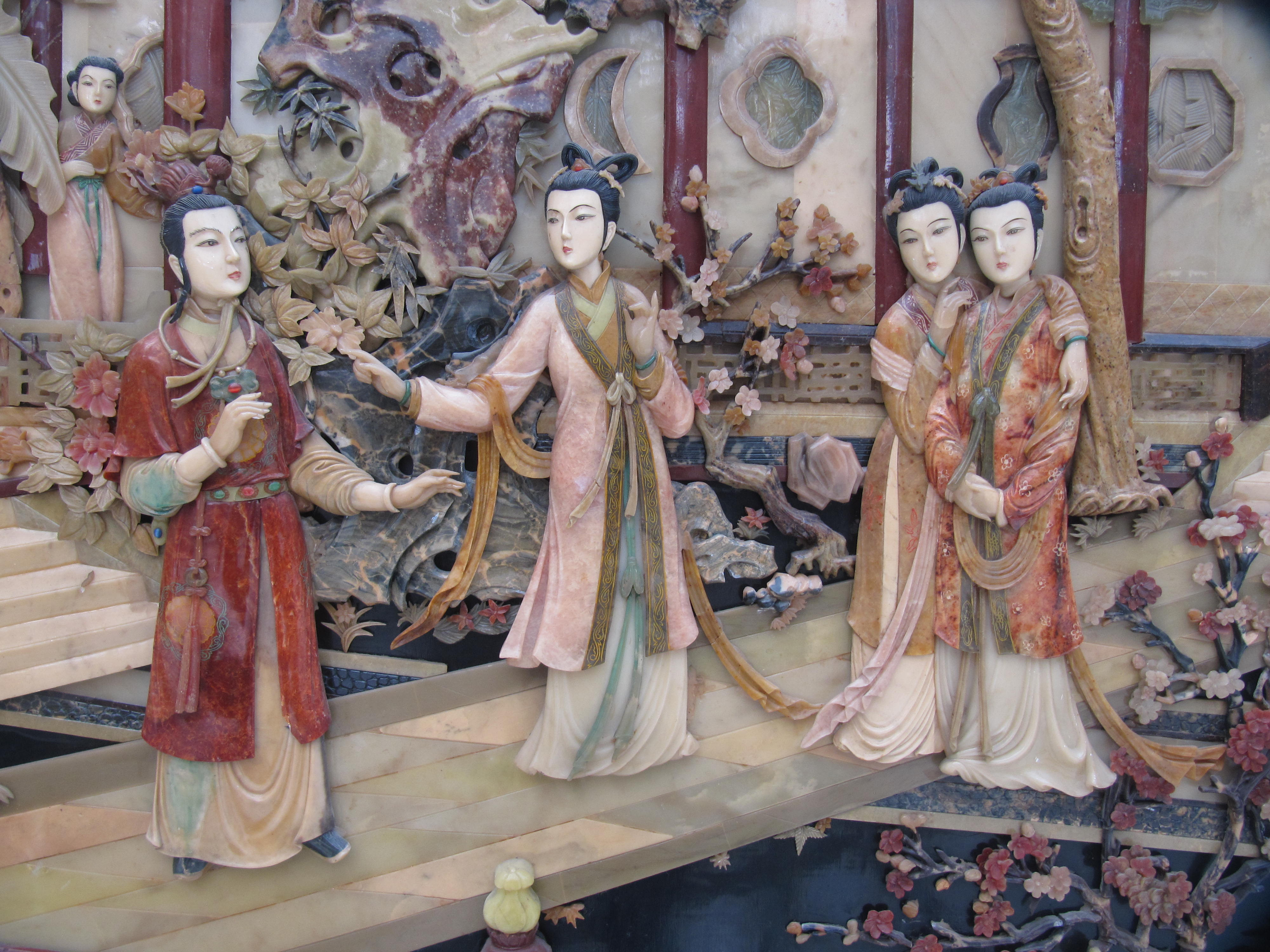
Beizi, from the 18th century novel Dream of the Red Chamber.

=== 21st century: Modern beizi and pifeng ===
The beizi and pifeng which are based on various dynasties regained popularity in the 21st century with the emergence of the Hanfu Movement and were modernized or improved.

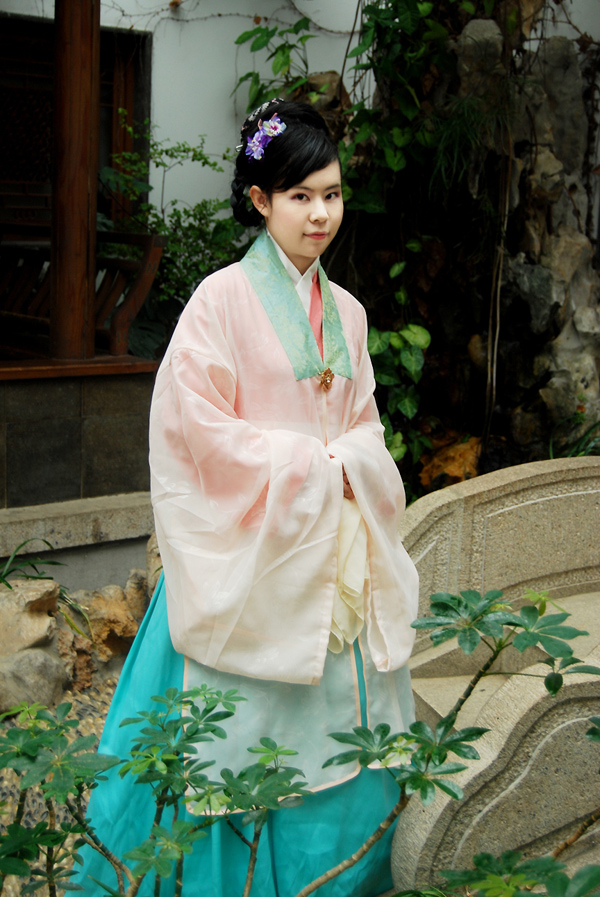
Modern pink pifeng.

== Construction and design ==
The beizi has a straight silhouette with vents and seams at the sides. It has a parallel/straight-collar (對襟; duijin); where a pair of disconnected foreparts lay parallel to each other. The beizi could also be found with side slits, which could start at beginning at the armpit down its length, or without any side slits at all. In the Song dynasty, the beizi was not fastened so that the inner clothing could be exposed. The beizi also came in variety of lengths, and the sleeves could vary in size (i.e. either narrow or broad).

Illustration of a beizi, Qing dynasty.

In the Song dynasty, other styles of beizi were also found in addition to the aforementioned style:

1. There is a style of beizi wherein ribbons could be hung from both the armpits and the back, with a silk belt which fastened the front and back of the beizi together, or the front and back parts of the beizi could also be left unbound. According to Cheng Dachang, the use of ribbons under the armpits was assumed to have been a way to imitate the crossing ribbons of earlier ancient Chinese clothing in order to maintain the clothing of the ancient times.
2. A "half-beizi", a beizi with short sleeves; it was originally worn as a military uniform but it was then worn by the literati and the commoners despite being against the Song dynasty's dressing etiquette.
3. A "sleeveless beizi", which looks like a modern sleeveless vest, was used as a casual clothing and could be found in the market. They were made of ramie or raw silk fabric.

The beizi also developed with time. The earlier Song dynasty beizi had a band which finished the edges down to the bottom hem, but with time, it developed further and a contrasting neckband which encircled the neck down to the mid-chest; a closing was also found at the mid-chest. In the Song dynasty, the sleeves of the beizi was fuller, but it became more tubular in shape in the Ming dynasty.

By the late Ming dynasty, the beizi (also known as pifeng) had become longer and almost covered the skirts completely which came to look almost like the men's clothing and the sleeves grew larger trailing well below the finger tips. The neckband, however, was shortened to reach mid-chest and the robe was made wider. In the Ming dynasty, beizi can be secured at the front either with a metal or jade clasp button called zimu kou (Chinese: 子母扣).

=== Gender differences ===
The gender difference is that while wide-sleeved beizi were considered formal wear for women (narrow-sleeved beizi were casual wear for women), both wide and narrow-sleeved beizi were only used as casual wear for men.

== Depictions and media ==
- In the Romance of the Three Kingdoms, Zhuge Liang is said to be wearing hechang.
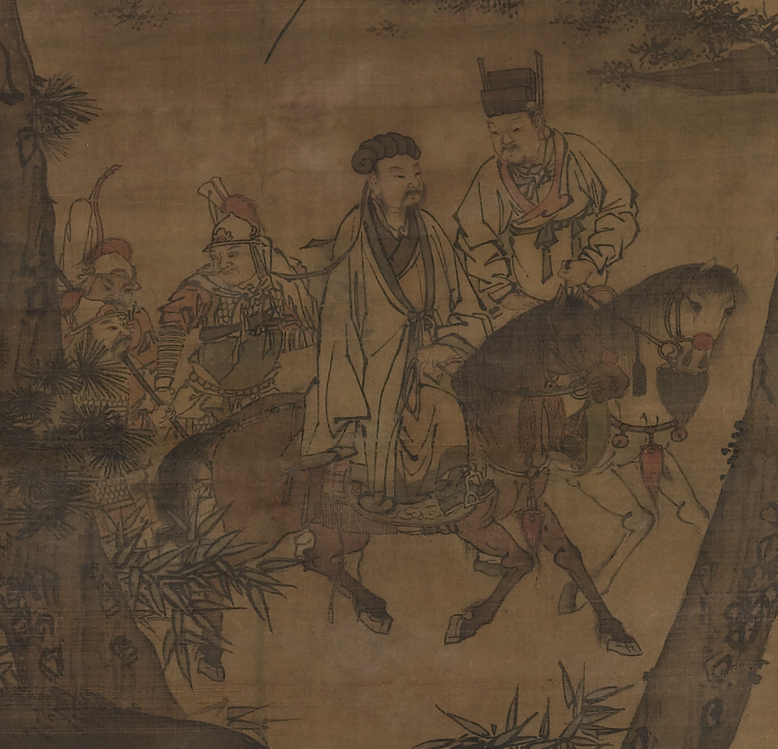
Zhu Geliang wearing a hechang (also known as beizi).

== Influences and derivatives ==
=== China ===
In Chinese opera, costumes such as nüpi (女帔; "a form of women's formal attire") and pi (帔; "a form of men's formal attire") were derived from the beizi worn during the Ming dynasty (i.e. pifeng). Both pi and nüpi had tubular sleeves which were longer than then wrist length. Water sleeves were also added to the sleeves for both pi and nüpi; the water sleeves worn with the nüpi are longer than those worn with the pi. The nüpi had straight sides and vents and was knee length; the length of the nüpi was historically accurate. The pi had a flared side seams with vents and was ankle-length. It could be closed with a single Chinese frog button or with a fabric tie.

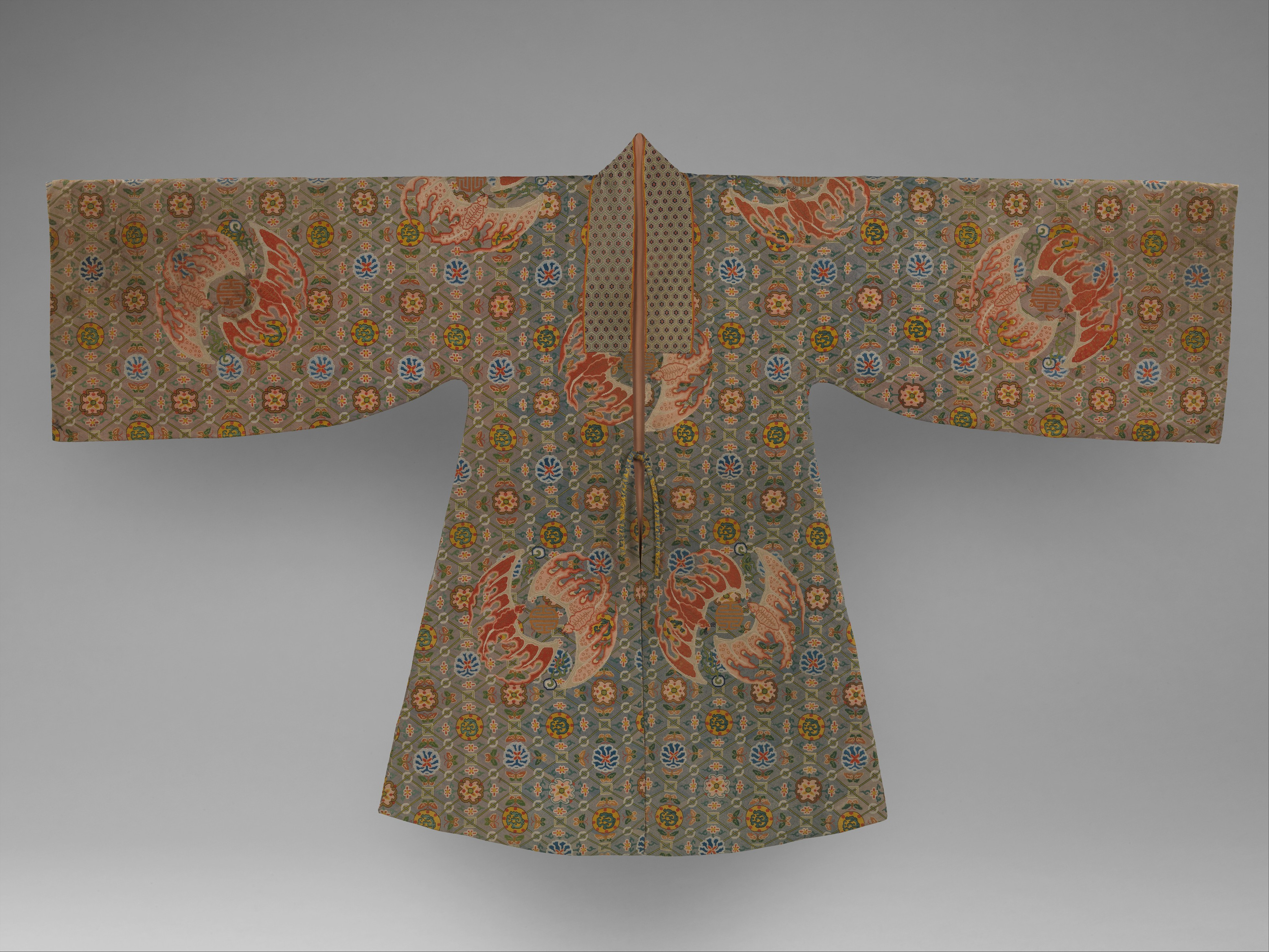
Qing dynasty period pi costume (front view).

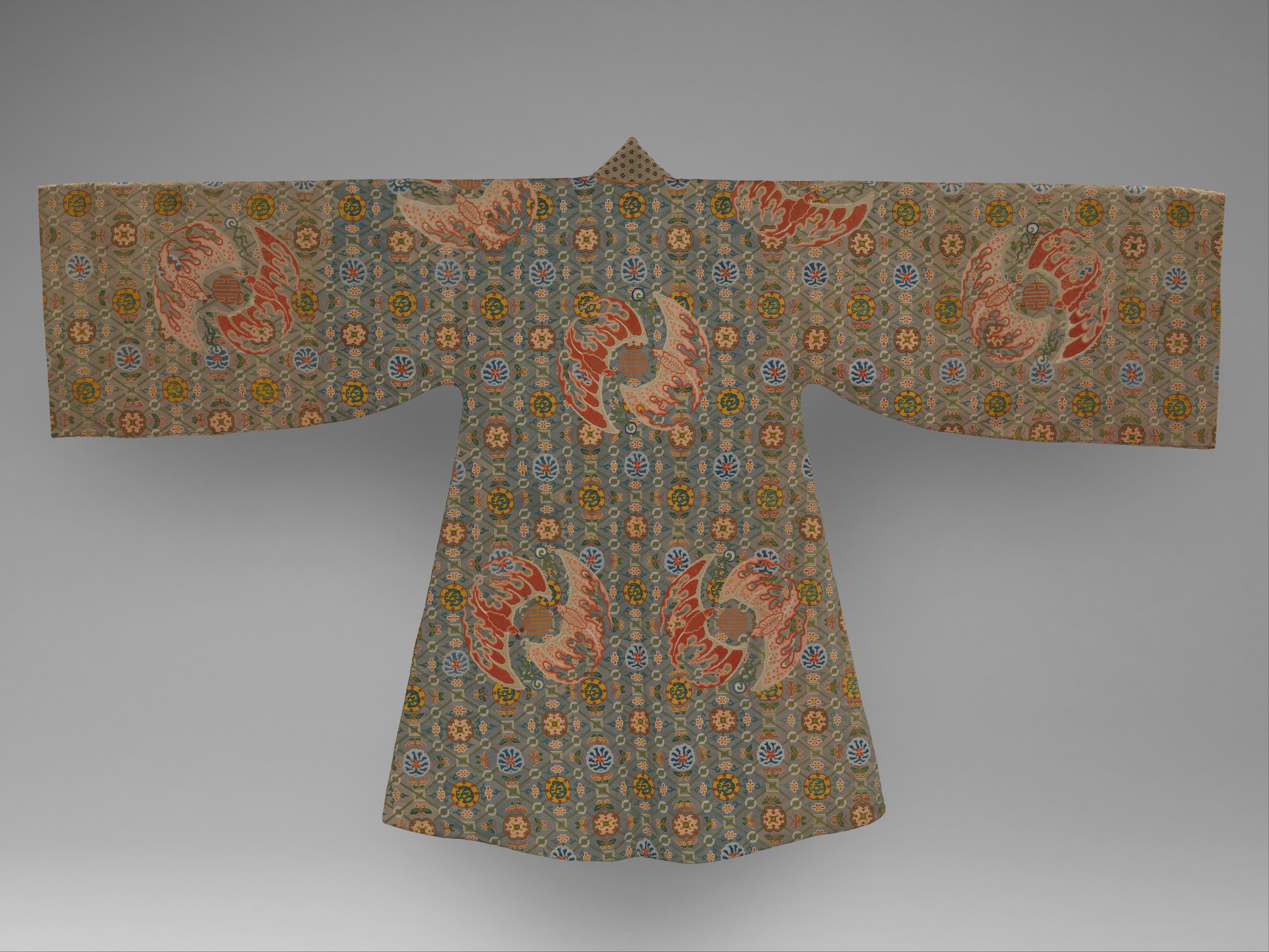
Qing dynasty period pi costume (back view).

=== Korea ===
The hechang (known as hakchang in Korea) was introduced during the 17th and 18th century in Joseon by people who had exchanges with Chinese or liked Chinese classic styles and gradually became popular among the Joseon people; Joseon scholars started to borrow the looks of Zhuge Liang due to the popularity of the Romance of the Three Kingdoms; and thus, the hakchangui was increasingly worn by more and more Joseon scholars. In Joseon, fans with white feather and the hakchangui became the representative clothing of Zhuge Liang, hermits, and scholars who followed taoism.

=== Vietnam ===
The Ao Nhat Binh (chữ Nôm: 襖日平, Vietnamese: Áo Nhật Bình, lit. 'rectangle-collared garb'), which was a casual outer garment worn by the female royal family, female officials, and high noble ladies of the Nguyen dynasty during informal occasions, originated from the Ming dynasty pifeng (Vietnamese: Áo Phi Phong) which was popular in China. The Ao Nhat Binh was further developed in the Nguyen dynasty to denote social ranking of women through the use of colours and embroidery patterns.

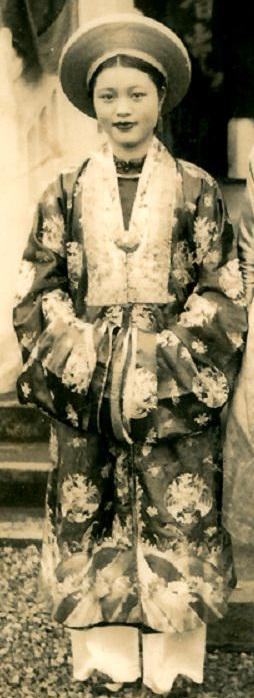
Vietnamese woman wearing Áo Nhật Bình

== Similar items ==
- Daxiushan
- Daopao in the form of hechang (crane cloak) - a form of Taoist clothing

== Related items ==
- Banbi

== See also ==
- Hanfu
- List of Hanfu
- Hanfu movement
