= Banbi =

Short sleeved clothing

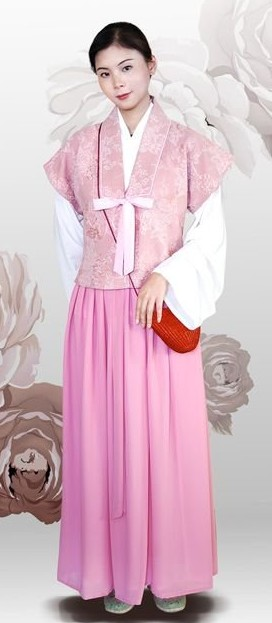
- Woman wearing a duijin banbi.

Chinese name
- Chinese: 半臂
- Literal meaning: half-arm
Transcriptions
Standard Mandarin
- Hanyu Pinyin: Bànbì

Alternative Chinese name
- Chinese: 半袖
- Literal meaning: half-sleeve
Transcriptions
Standard Mandarin
- Hanyu Pinyin: Bànxiù

Korean name
- Hangul: 반비
- Hanja: 半臂

Japanese name
- Kanji: 半臂
- Hiragana: はんぴ
Transcriptions
- Romanization: Hanpi

Banbi (Chinese: 半臂; lit. 'half-arm'), also known as banxiu (半袖; 'half-sleeves'), is an upper garment item in Hanfu. It was sometimes referred to as beizi (褙子) or half-beizi (i.e. short-sleeved beizi) before the term beizi eventually came to refer to a long-sleeved beizi in the Song dynasty, and referred as dahu in the Yuan dynasty. The banbi is in the form of a waistcoat or outerwear with short sleeves, which could either be worn over or under a long-sleeved ruqun. The style of its collar varies. It can be secured at the front either with ties or a metal button.

== Classification ==
There were various forms of banbi throughout history. In present days, the different forms of banbi are generally classified based on their collar shapes: e.g. duijin (对襟) which is straight or parallel in shape; jiaoling (交领) which is cross-collared in shape; tanling (坦领) which is U-shaped, yuanling (圆领) which is round-collared in shape; and fangling (方领) which is squared-collared in shape.

== History ==
=== Ancient ===
According to the Chinese records, the banbi was a clothing style, which was invented from the duanru (短襦; 'short jacket') that the Chinese wear. It was first designated as a waistcoat for palace maids, but its popularity soon reached the commoners. It was recorded in the Book of Jin, when Emperor Ming of Wei met Yang Fu, the emperor himself was dressed in commoner's banbi.

Han dynasty banbi

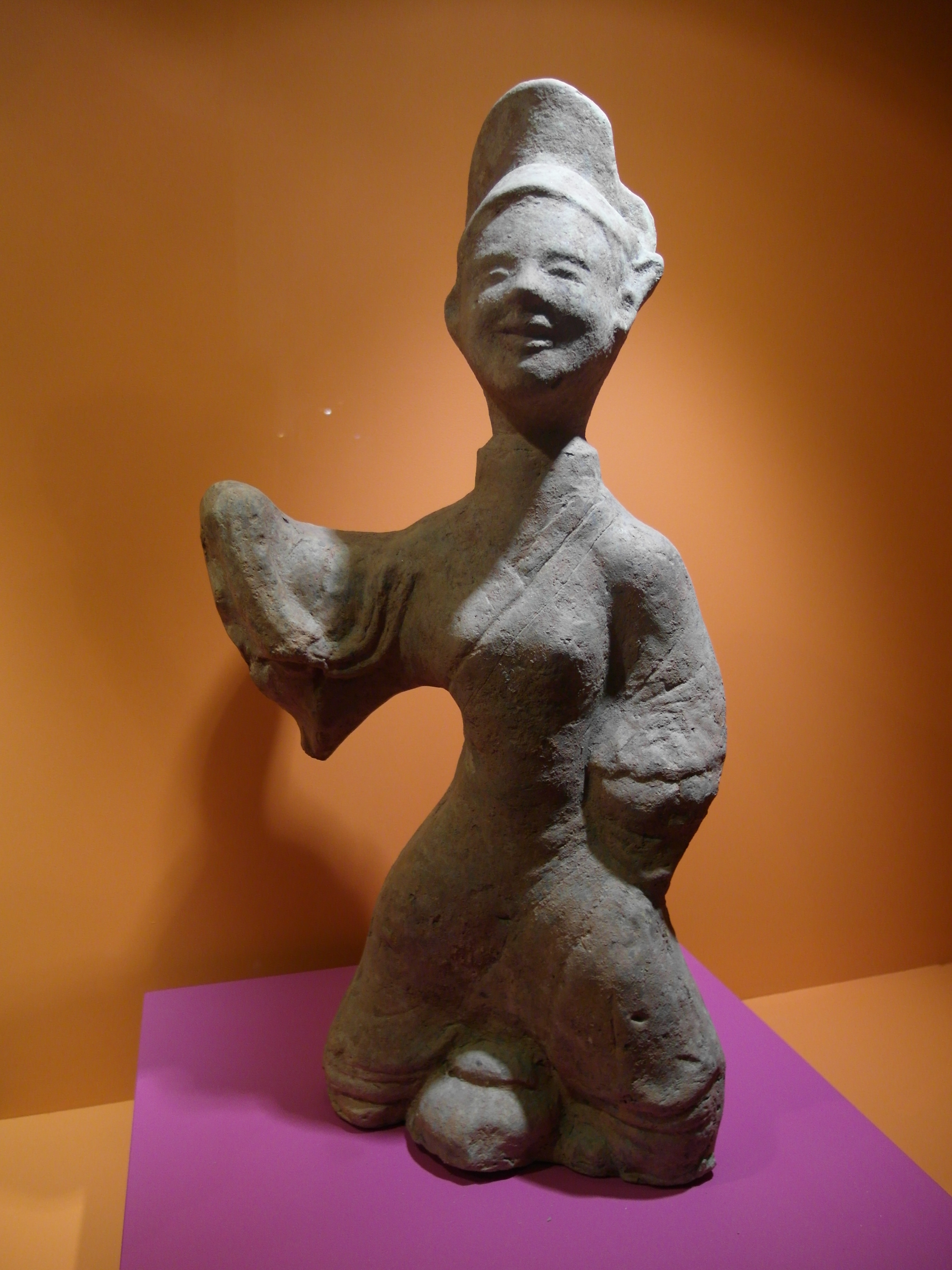
A woman wearing a cross-collared banbi, Han dynasty.

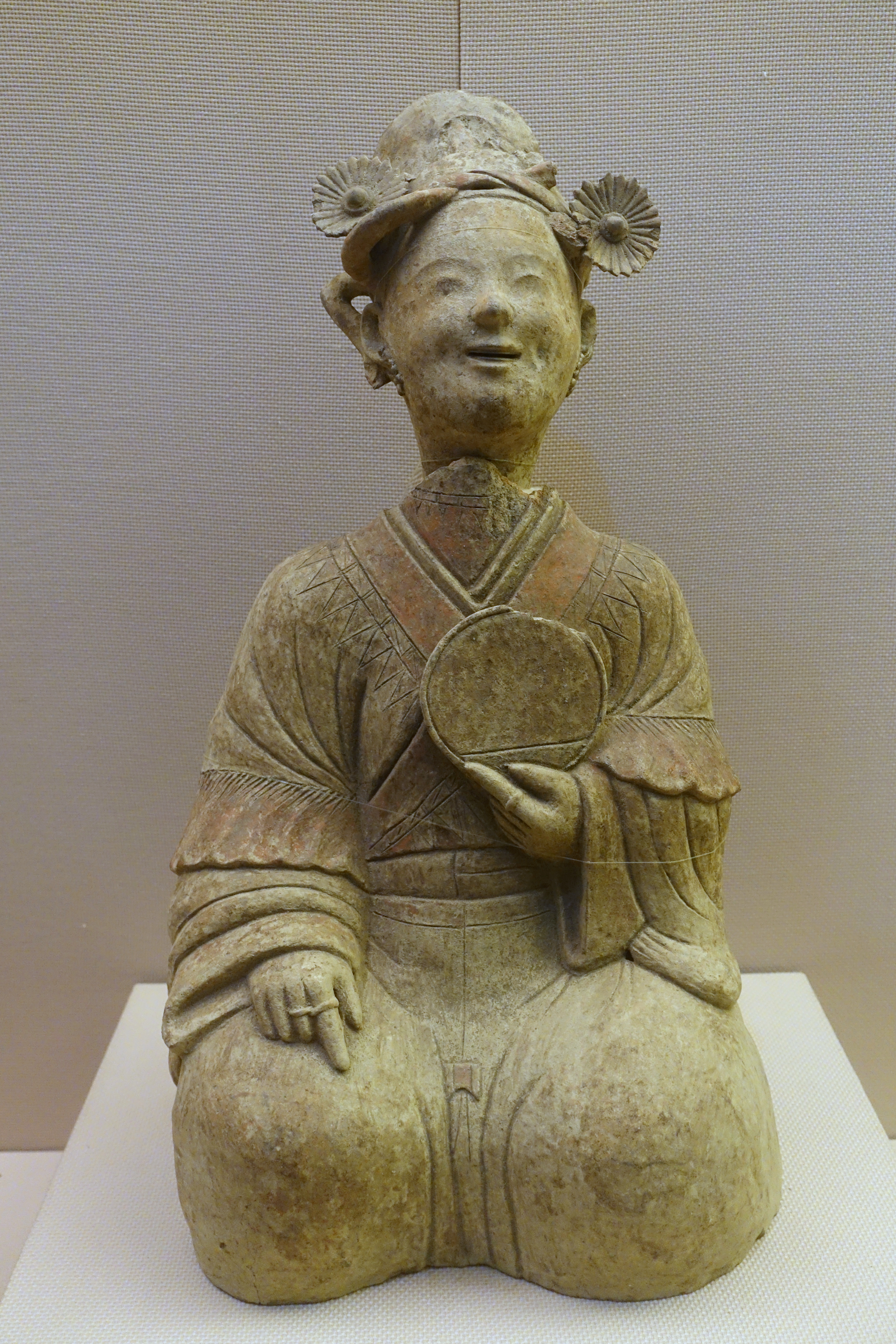
Woman wearing a cross-collared banbi, Eastern Han dynasty, 25–220 AD.
Cao Wei, Jin, Northern and Southern dynasties

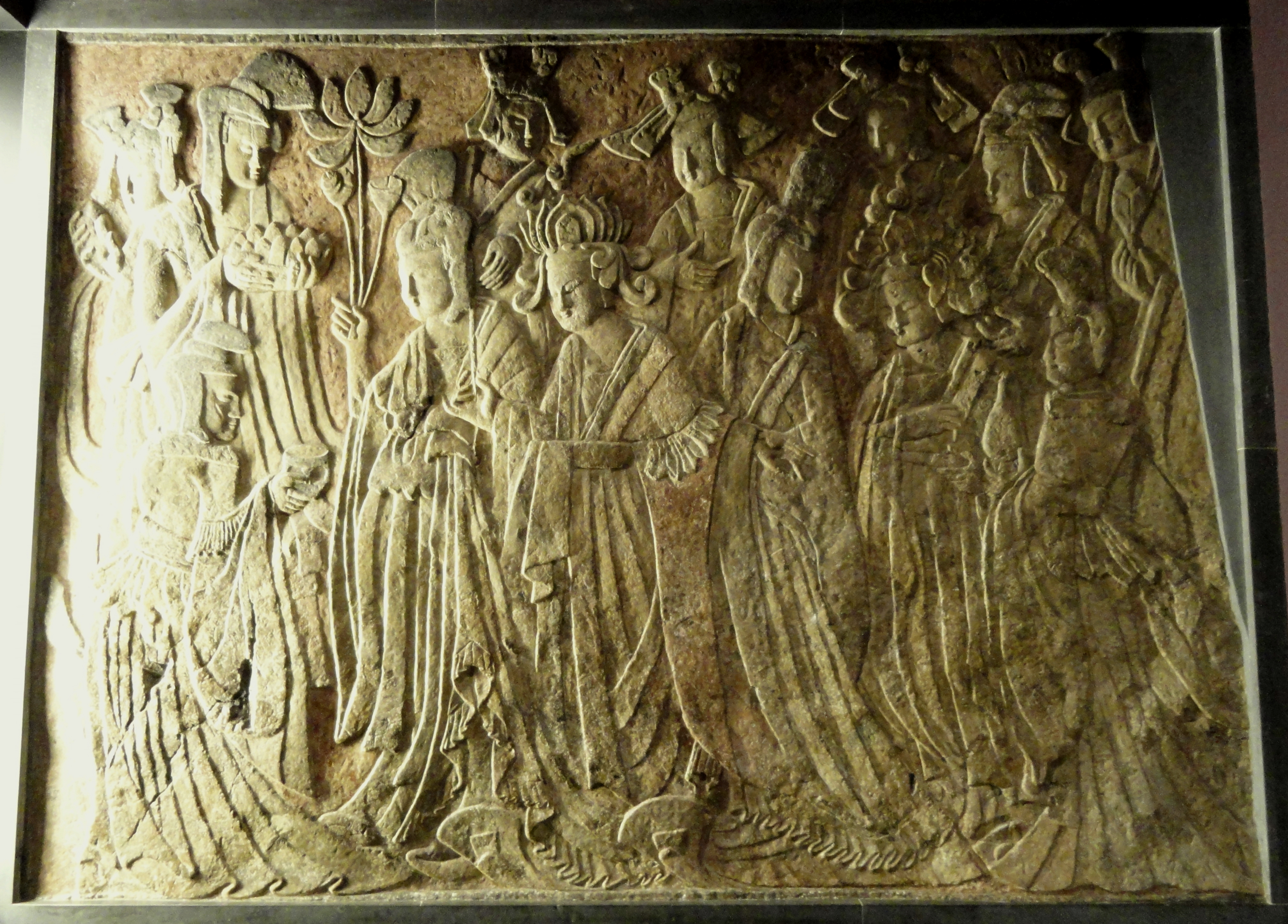
A woman wearing a parallel collar banbi, Northern Wei dynasty, about 522 AD.

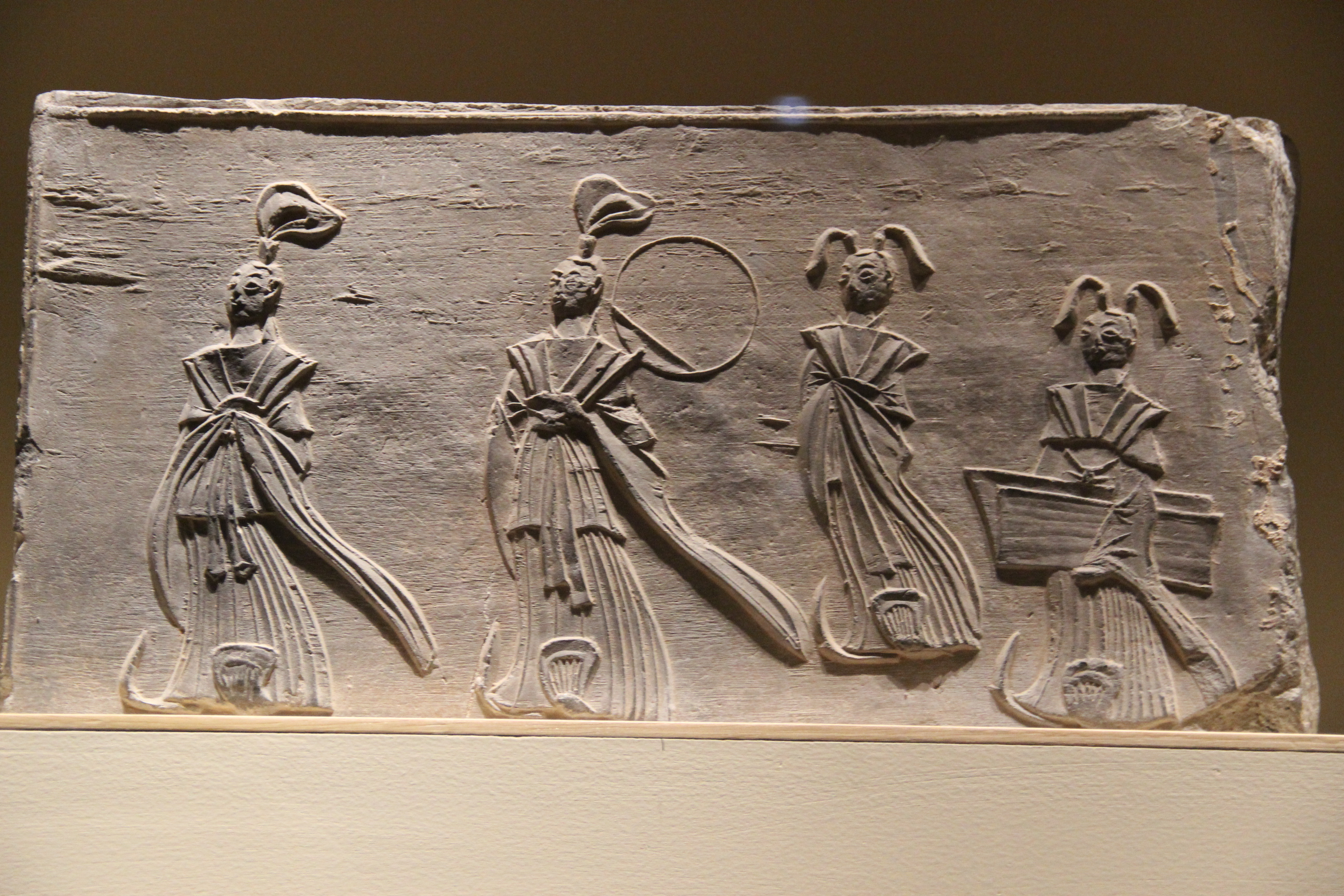
Women wearing parallel collar banbi, Southern Dynasties Brick Relief.

=== Tang dynasty ===
During Tang dynasty, the banbi was worn by men and women. The banbi was a staple clothing item for the Tang dynasty women, along with shan (a blouse which could be low cut during this period) and high-waisted skirts. The banbi was worn on the shan. The banbi could either be worn under or over the skirt. Banbi could also be worn under the yuanlingshan.

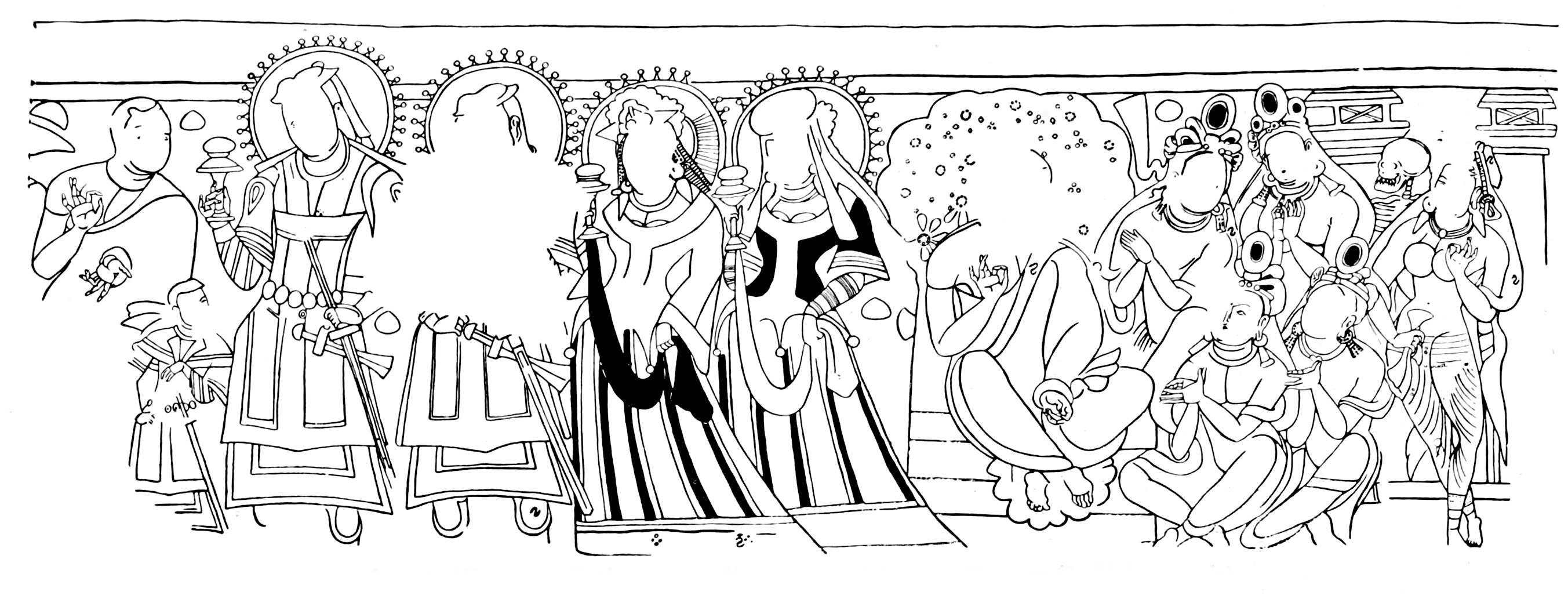
Women of Qiuci wearing U-shaped banbi (middle) which shares similarities in shapes and customs with those worn in the early Tang dynasty, Kizil caves.

During Tang dynasty, there was another form of banbi or short sleeve waistcoat worn called kedang (袔裆). The sleeve covers around the shoulder area and there is no opening in the front or back. In order to wear it, people would have to tuck in, then out from the neck of the clothing. Generally, it's worn outside of a long sleeve shirt. In the "Legend of Huo Xiao Yu" (崔小玉传) that was written during Tang dynasty, the main female character Huo Xiaoyu wear this style most of the time. It is suggested that a type of banbi was adopted from Central Asia during the Tang dynasty through the Silk Road when cultural exchanges were frequent, and that it was also known as beizi during Tang dynasty. In the early Tang dynasty, the shape of the banbi worn in this period appears to have been mainly influenced by those worn in Qiuci, for example, the shape of the U-shaped banbi in Qiuci shared similarities with those worn in the early Tang dynasty.

In Japan's Nara city, the Todaiji temple's Shosoin repository has 30 banbi (called hanpi in Japan) from Tang dynasty China; they are cross-collared closing to the right, most dating from the 8th century. The eighth century Shosoin banbi's variety show it was in vogue at the time and most likely derived from much more ancient clothing.

Tang dynasty banbi

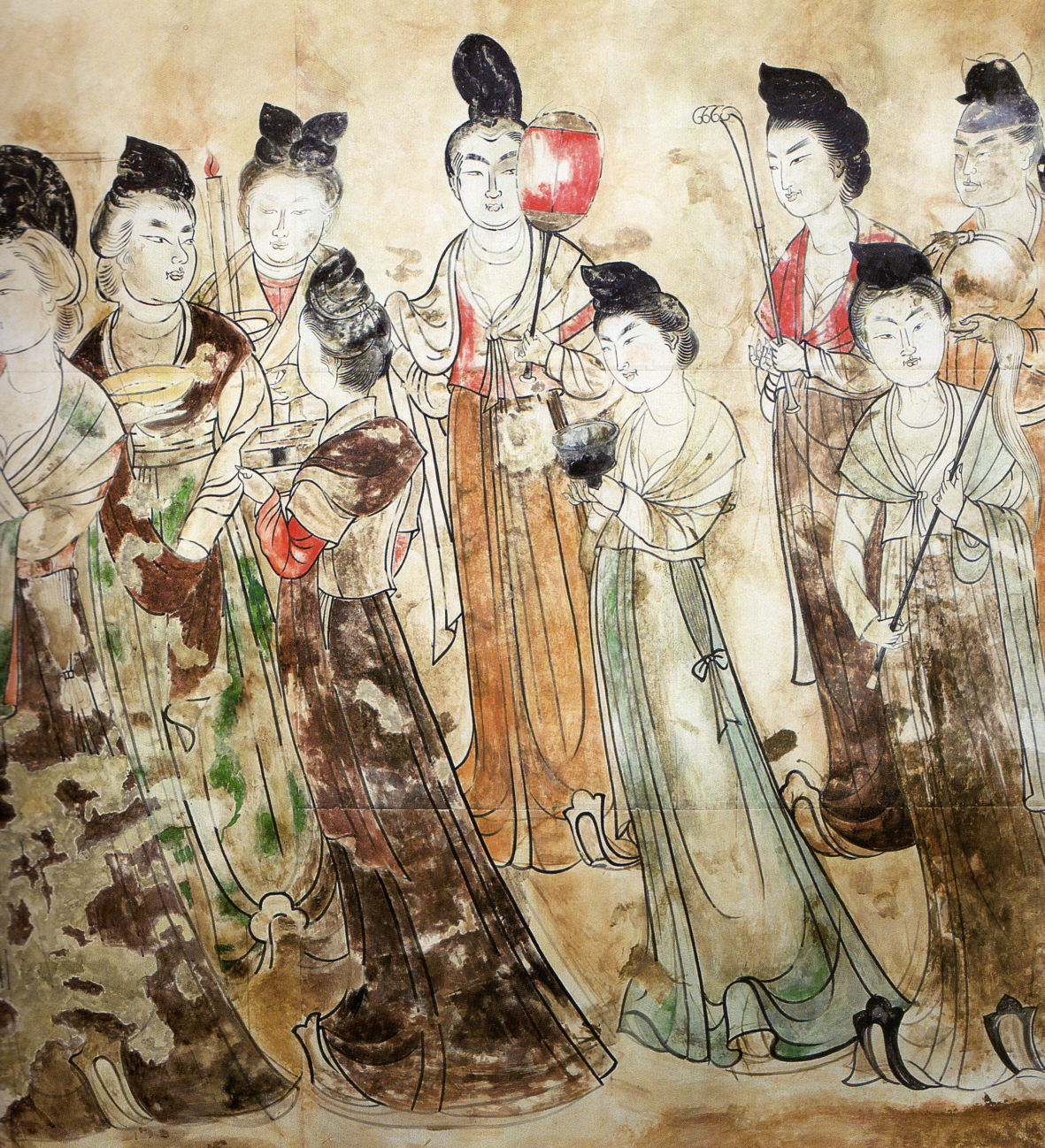
Court Ladies of the Tang dressed in Banbi with scarfs wrapped around it.

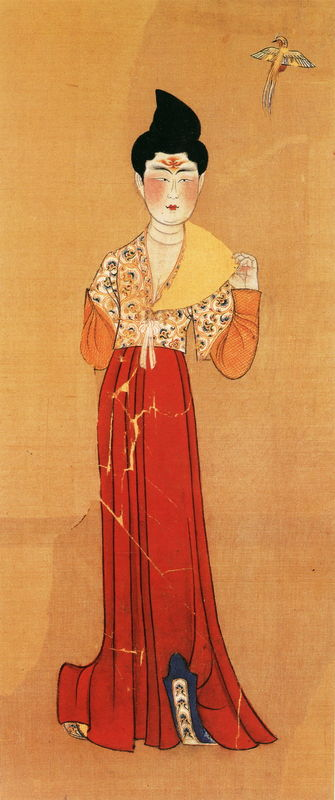
A painting of a lady during the Tang dynasty.

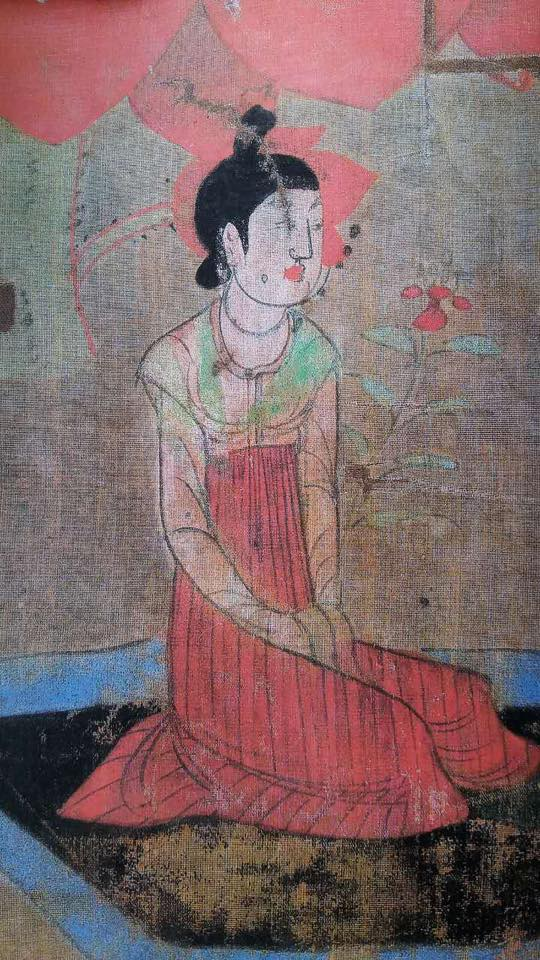
A Tang dynasty Woman wearing a green, U-shaped collar banbi.

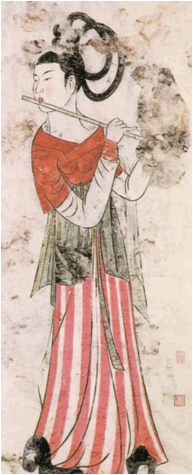
Fresco of a Tang dynasty Musician wearing a loose, red cross-collared banbi.

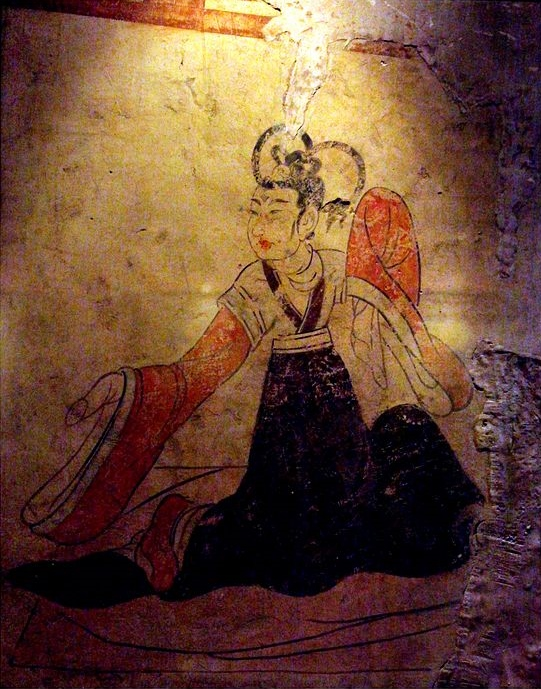
Fresco of a Tang dynasty Musician wearing a loose, blue cross-collared banbi.

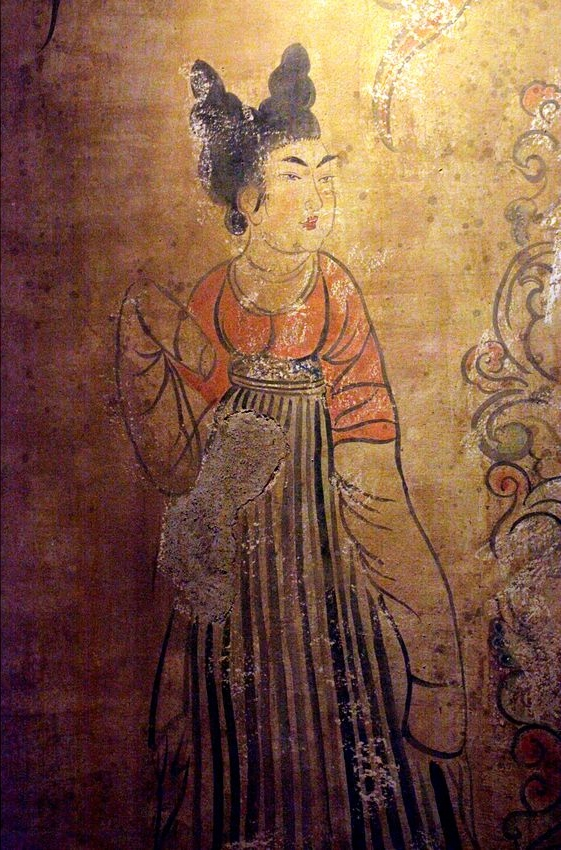
A Tang dynasty Woman wearing a red U-shaped collar banbi under her skirt.

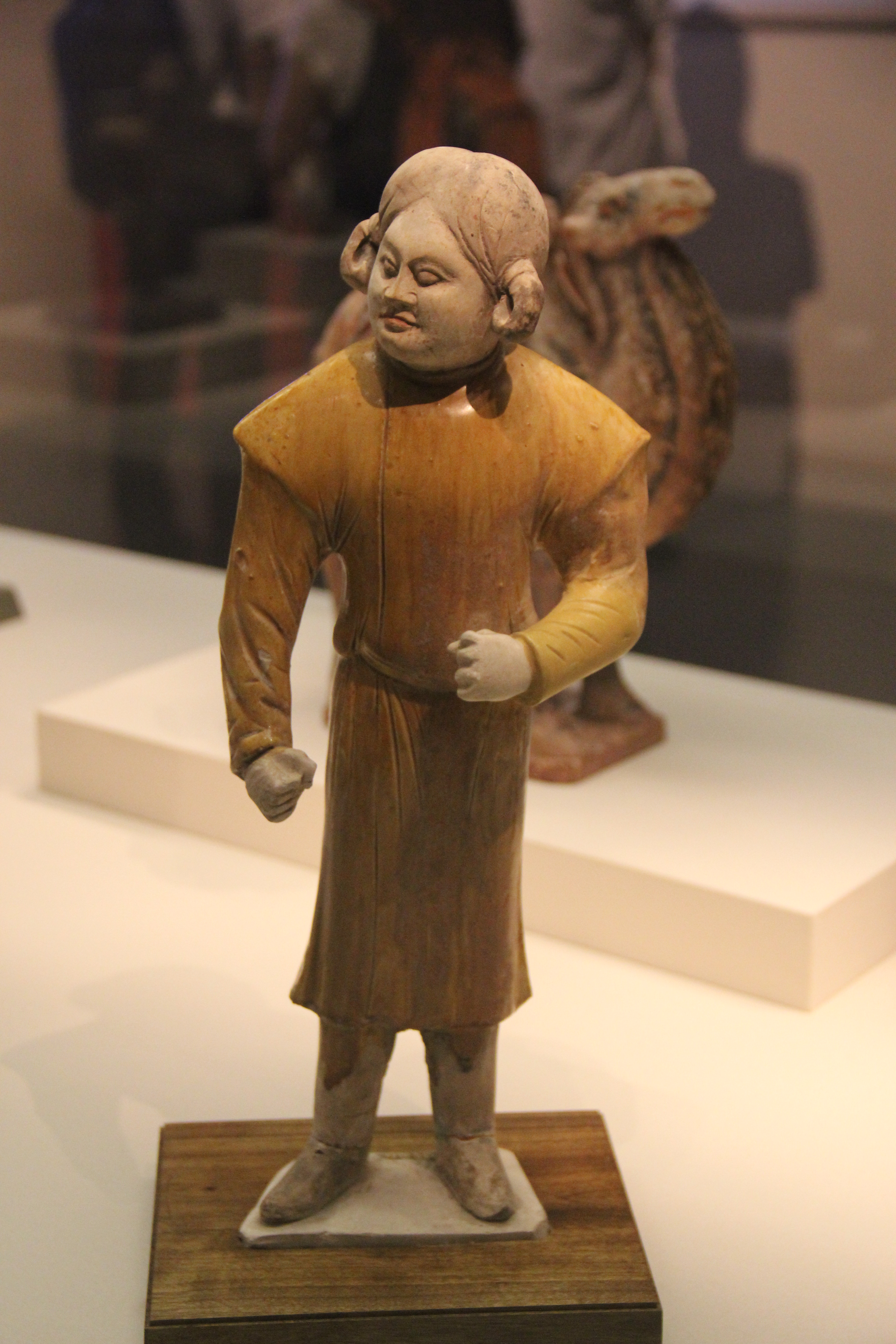
The bulges at the woman's shoulders areas hints the presence of a banbi worn under yuanlingshan.

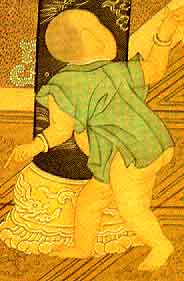
Baby banbi, Tang dynasty

=== Song dynasty ===
In the Song dynasty, the half-beizi (i.e. banbi) was originally a military uniform which was later worn by the commoners and by the literal class.

=== Yuan dynasty ===
In the Yuan dynasty, the casual clothing for men mainly followed the dress code of the Han people and they wore banbi as a casual clothing item while ordinary women clothing consisted of banbi and ruqun. Han Chinese women also wore a combination of a cross-collar upper garment which had elbow length sleeves (i.e. cross-collar banbi) over a long-sleeved blouse under a skirt with an abbreviated wrap skirts were also popular in Yuan; This form of set of clothing was a style which slightly deviated from the ruqun worn in the Tang and Song dynasties.

There were several types of banbi in the Yuan dynasty: straight collar short shan with half-sleeves (直领短衫), a half-sleeved long robe (长袍; changpao) with a cross-collar closing to the right (交领右衽; jiaoling youren) which was specifically called dahu (was worn by Mongol men during and prior to the founding of the Yuan dynasty), and square-collar long robe (方领对襟长袍; fāng lǐng duì jīn cháng páo with half-sleeves.

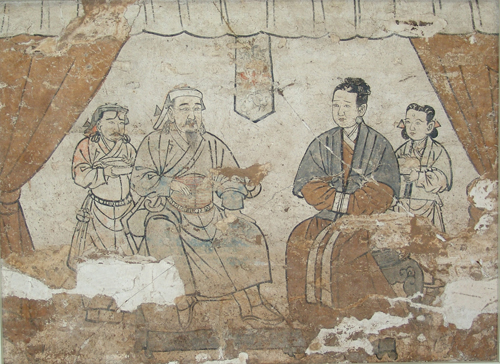
Two women (right) wearing parallel collar banbi, Yuan dynasty

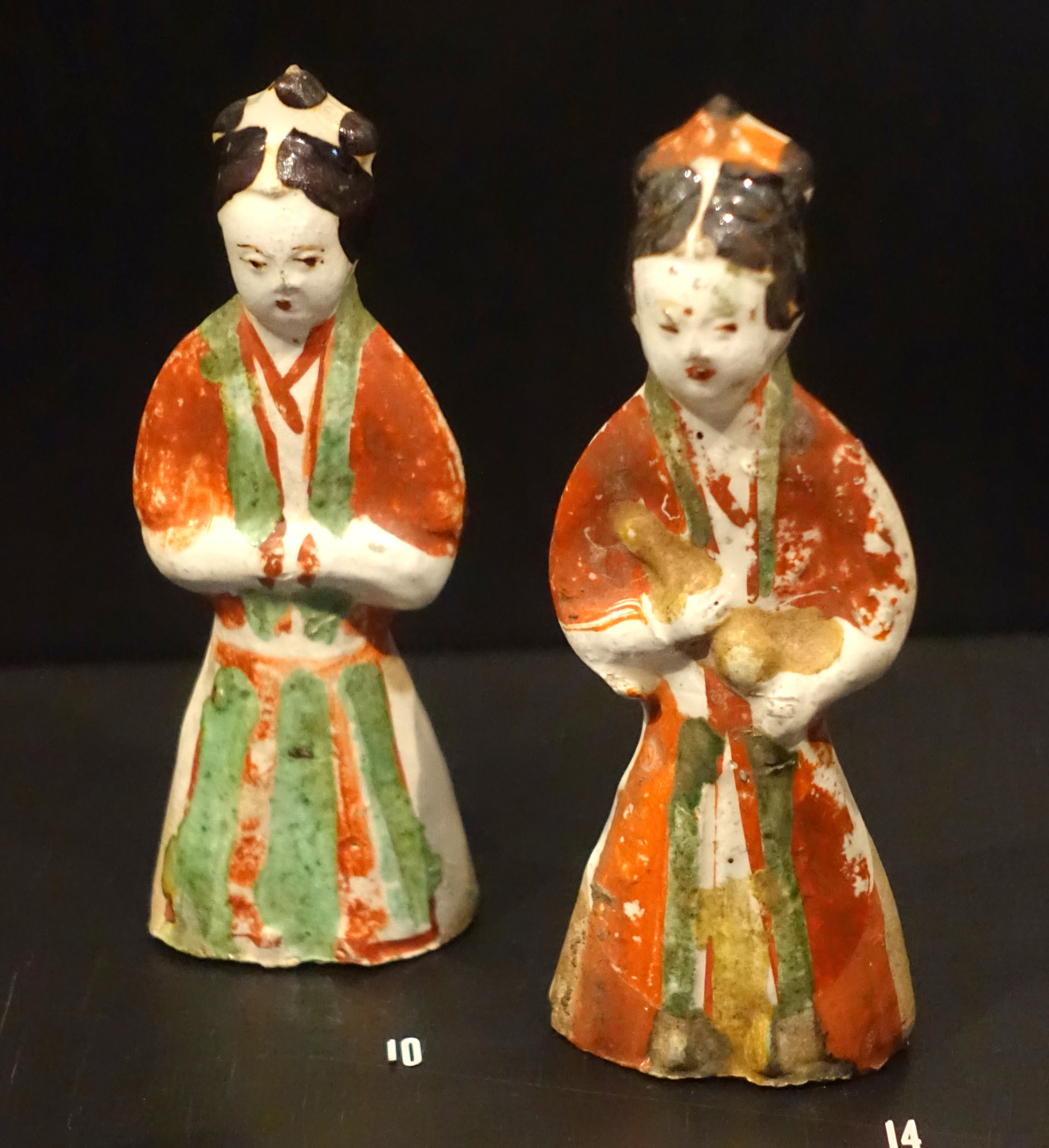
Women wearing banbi over aoqun.

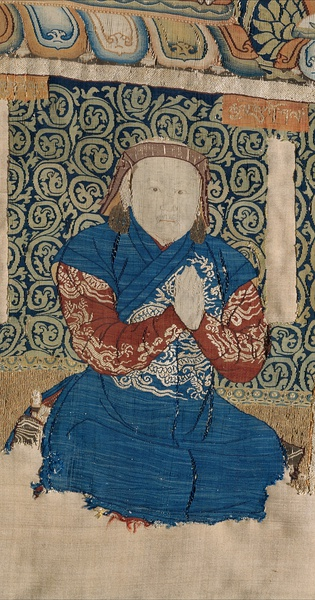
Khutughtu Khan wearing a dahu, Yuan dynasty, ca. 1330–32.

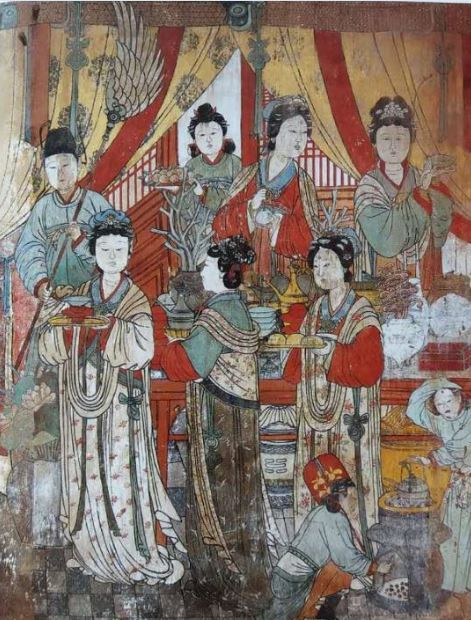
Women depicted in the Fresco in the Hall of King Mingying. Han women wore elbow-length sleeves, cross-collar upper garment over a long-sleeved blouse; the abbreviated skirts were popular in Yuan.

=== Ming dynasty ===
In the Ming dynasty, the dahu was either a new type of banbi whose designs was influenced by the Mongol Yuan dynasty clothing.

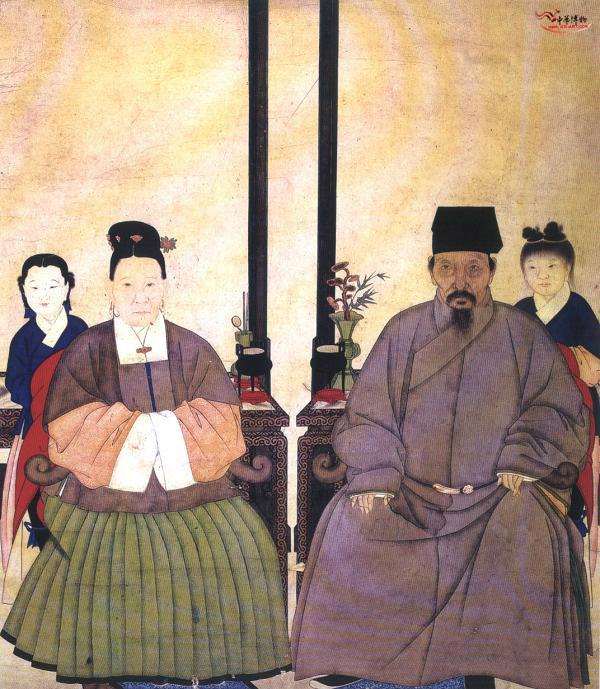
A Ming dynasty portrait illustrating a woman wearing Banbi

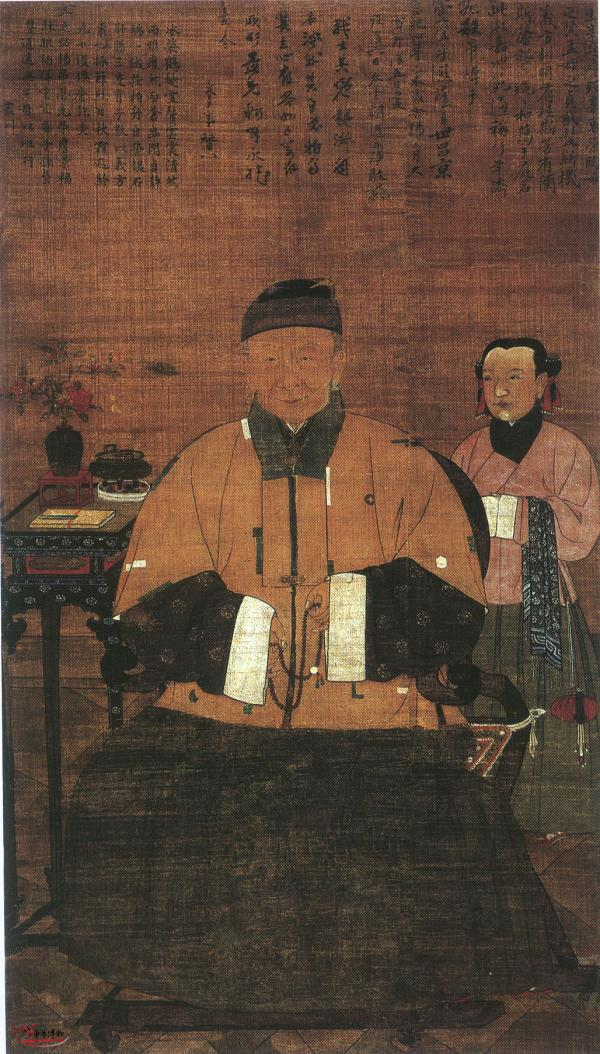
A Ming dynasty portrait illustrating a woman wearing Banbi

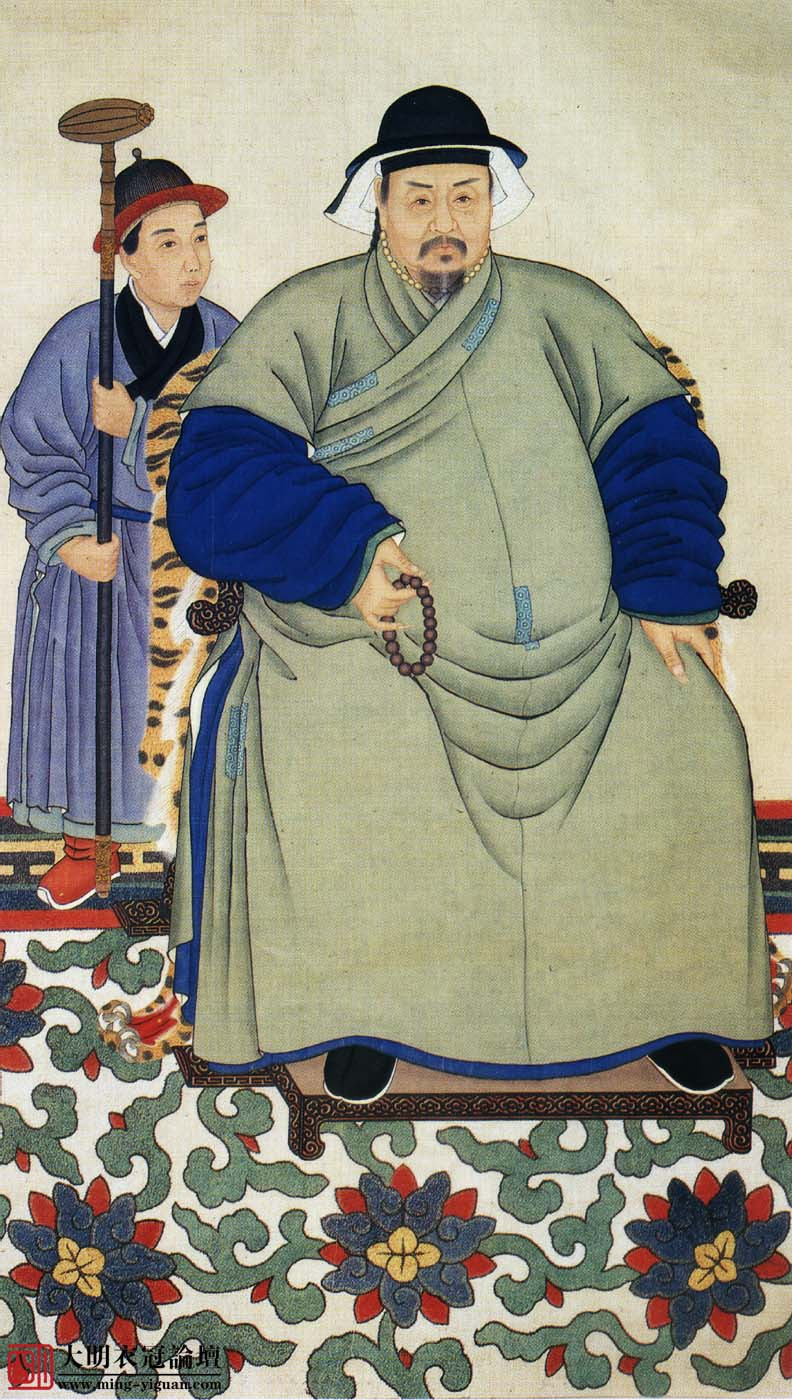
A man wearing a green dahu, a Ming dynasty painting.

=== Qing dynasty ===
In the Qing dynasty dictionary called Gujin Tushu Jicheng (古今圖書集成), the banbi is depicted with no sleeves.

Banbi, from the Gujin Tushu Jicheng, section "Ceremonial Usages", between 1700 and 1725

== Derivative and influences ==
=== China ===
It is assumed that the long-sleeved beizi (褙子), which originated in the Song dynasty, was derived from the banbi, when the sleeves and the garment were lengthened. According to Ye Mende, the beizi was initially worn as a military clothing with "half-sleeves"; the sleeves were later extended and hanging ribbons were added from the armpits and back.

=== Japan ===
==== Hanpi ====
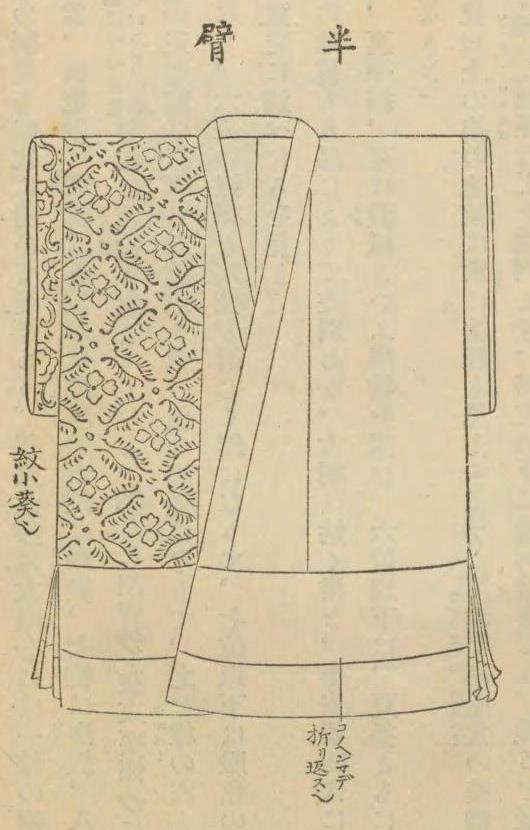
Hanpi, from "Depiction of costumes" published by Rinhei Shoten, 1932.

In Japan, banbi are known as hanpi (半臂/はんぴ, lit. "half-arm") and are short coats. In Japan, the hanpi was either imported from China or were modelled to look very closely to the Tang dynasty banbi. It was as a sleeveless short undergarment for men of the aristocracy; it commonly worn in summer.

=== Korea ===
During the rule of Queen Jindeok of Silla (r. 647–654), Kim Chunchu personally traveled to Tang to request for clothing and belts; one of the requested clothing was banbi (Korean: 반비; Hanja: 半臂). The banbi later reappeared in the clothing prohibition decreed by King Heungdeok of Silla (r. 826–836). During the Silla period, the banbi may have been worn on sam (衫, a type of upper garment) which also corresponds to the way banbi was worn by men and women during the Tang dynasty.

The banbi from the Unified Silla period appears to have also been worn in Goryeo.

== Similar-looking items ==
- Dahu – A form of banbi in Ming dynasty influenced by the Mongol clothing of the Yuan dynasty
- Beizi - a long sleeved over jacket in China
- Beixin/Bijia - Sleeveless jacket in China
- Baeja - A sleeveless or very short-sleeved vest in Korea

== See also ==
- Hanfu
- List of hanfu
