= Ru (upper garment) =

Form of Chinese upper garment

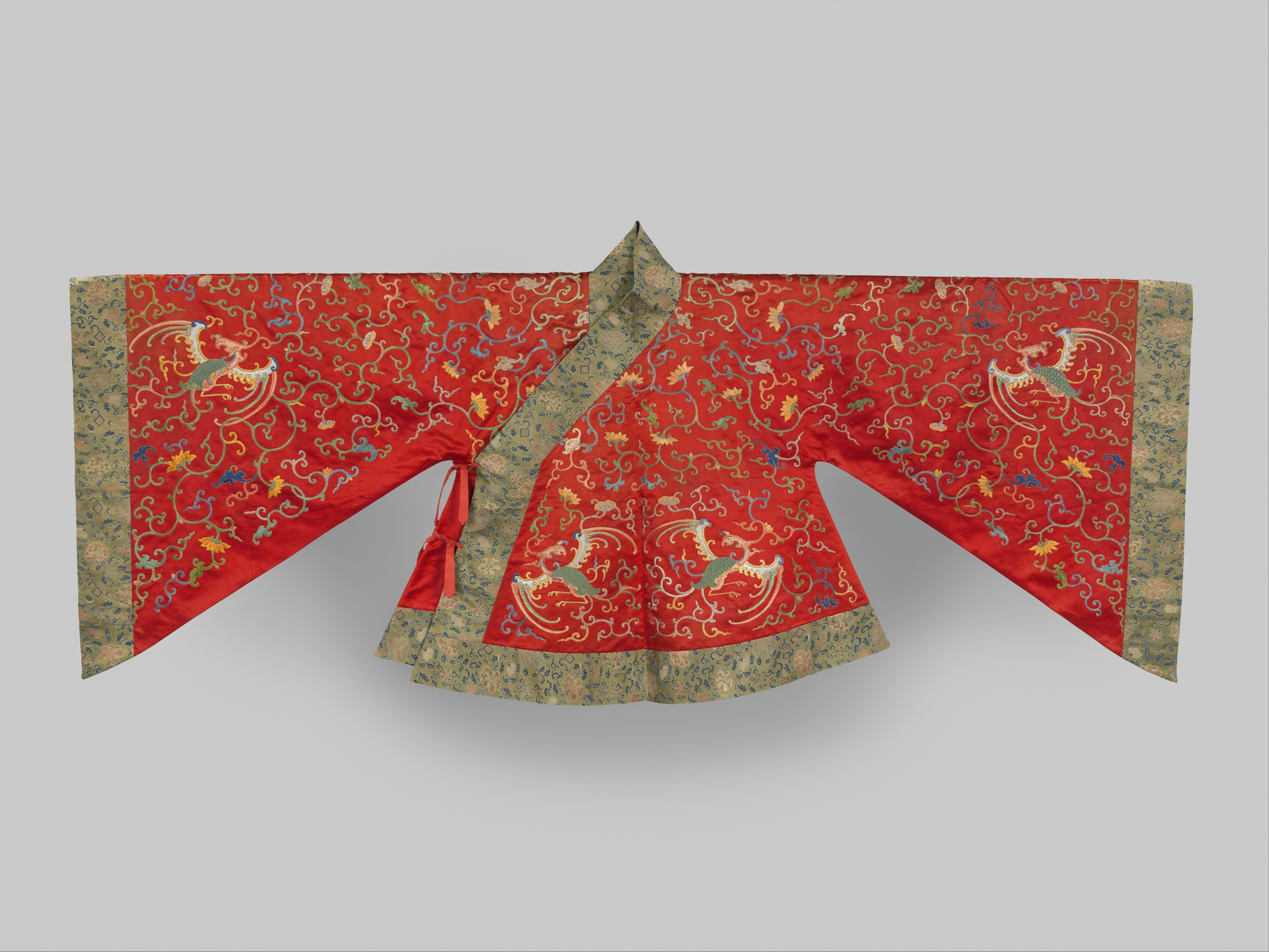
- Theatrical coat for Court Lady, 18th century.

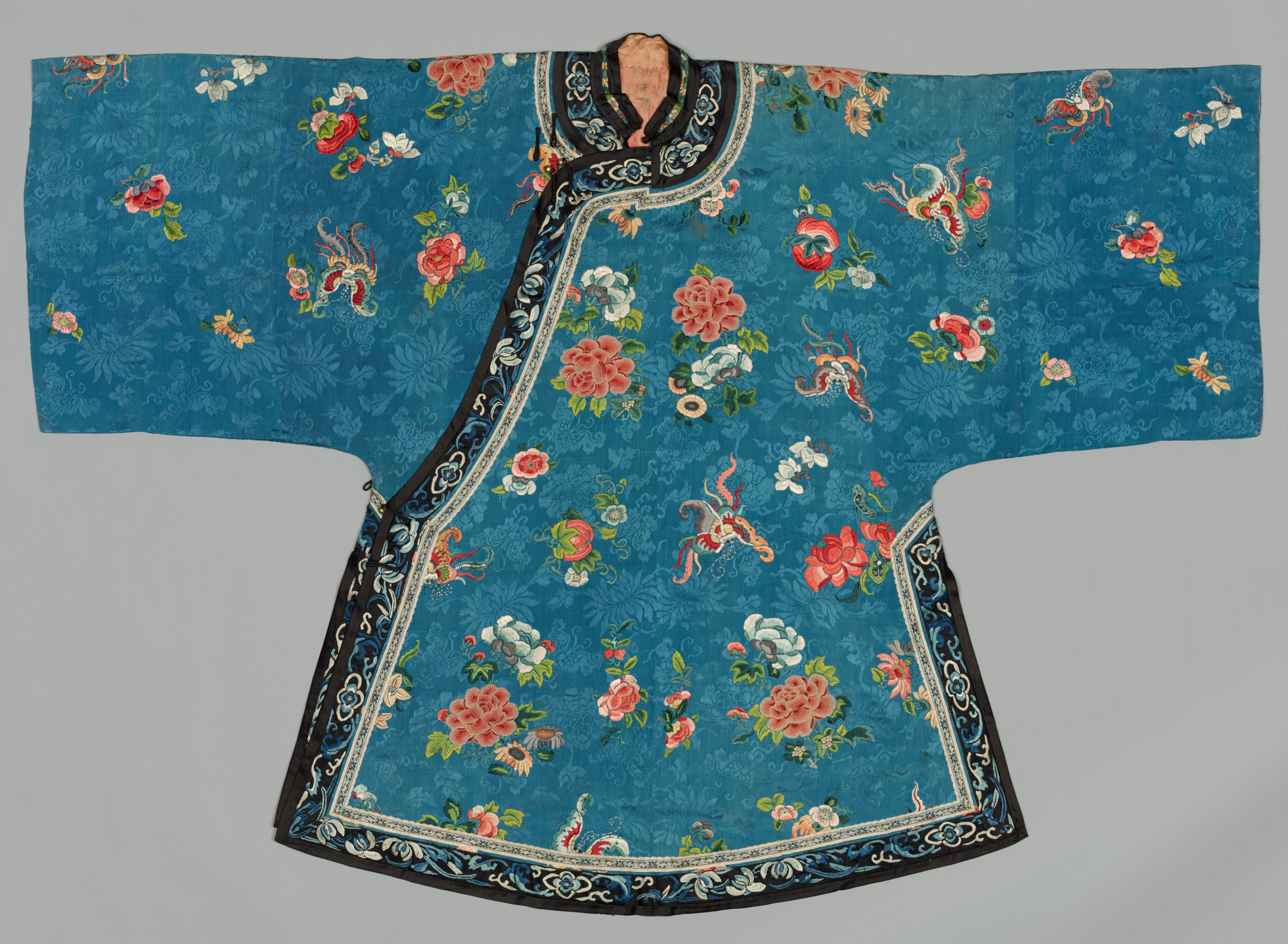
- Han Woman's ao, 19th century, from the Cleveland Museum of Art
- Chinese: 襦
- Literal meaning: short coat/ jacket
Transcriptions
Standard Mandarin
- Hanyu Pinyin: Rú

Shan
- Chinese: 衫
- Literal meaning: shirt; robe; gown; jacket
Transcriptions
Standard Mandarin
- Hanyu Pinyin: shān
- Tongyong Pinyin: shān

Ao
- Chinese: 袄
- Traditional Chinese: 襖
- Literal meaning: outer garments/ coat/ jacket/ lined coat
Transcriptions
Standard Mandarin
- Hanyu Pinyin: ǎo

Yi
- Chinese: 衣
- Literal meaning: Clothes/ garment
Transcriptions
Standard Mandarin
- Hanyu Pinyin: Yī

Ru (Chinese: 襦; pinyin: rú), sometimes referred to as shan (Chinese: 衫; pinyin: shān), ao (simplified Chinese: 袄; traditional Chinese: 襖; pinyin: ǎo), and yi (Chinese: 衣; pinyin: yī), is a form of traditional Chinese upper garment, or coat, or jacket, which typically has a right closure; however, they may also have a front central opening. It is traditional everyday wear for women of the Han Chinese ethnic group. It can be worn in combination with a skirt in a style called ruqun, or a pair of trousers in a style called shanku.

The shape and structure of Chinese upper garments, generally referred as yi (衣), varied depending on the time period. Garments that overlap and close to the right originated in China and are called yòurèn (右衽; 'right lapel'). The style of yi which overlaps at the front and closes on the right in a y-shape is known as jiāolǐngyòurèn (交領右衽; 'intersecting collar right lapel') (Note: jiaolingyouren garment can also be described as y-shaped collar or being a cross-collar garment closing to the right.) and first appeared in the Shang dynasty. Since then the jiaolingyouren yi has been one of the major symbols of the Sino Kingdom and eventually spread throughout Asia. The structure of the jackets worn in the late Qing shared some features of those worn by the ethnic Han during the Ming dynasty. They continued to evolve and be worn in some form during the Republic of China. Since the 1930s, the popularity of traditional Han fashion declined in favor of the qipao and Western dress. It has regained prominence in the 21st century following the Hanfu movement.

== Terminology ==
=== Yi ===
Qingyiqun (青衣裙), from the Qing dynasty Gujin Tushu Jicheng

The term yi (衣) generally refers to clothing. In ancient times, the term yi referred to an upper outer garment. The term yi appeared in ancient texts to refer to upper garments, such as in the Luyi, in the Mao Commentary, in the Analects, and in the I Ching.

=== Ru/ shan/ ao/ gua ===
The term ru (襦) has sometimes been used as a synonym word for the clothing items shan (衫) and ao (袄; 襖).

==== Ru and gua ====
The ru can refer to both a long or short jacket. The ru also had different names depending on its characteristics, such as its length and the presence or absence of lining.

The ru (襦), when referring to a short jacket, can be found with either short or long sleeves. A short ru is also known as duanru (Chinese: 短襦; lit. 'short jacket'; a type of duanru is the yaoru (腰襦; 'waist jacket') which is waist-length. In the Mawangdui Silk Manuscripts, the character ru《襦》refers to a 'short coat'. The Shuowen also described the ru as being a form of duanyi (短衣; 'short clothing'). It is also described as a common form of duanyi in the Guangyun.

In the Han dynasty, the ru could be unlined, lined or padded. According to the Shiming, a ru is a padded jacket, which is soft and warm; a danru (襌(单)襦; 襌(單)襦; 'unlined jacket') is described as being similar to a ru which does not have cotton wadding.

There is also the term chángrú (长襦; 長襦; 'long jacket') which appear in texts and has been described as the precursor of the chang ao by scholars. According to the Guangyun, however, the changru can also be a form of paofu. In the Zhou dynasty, a long ru was referred as the gua while the furu referred to ru with lining and which was similar to the paofu in terms of form. According to the Guangyun, a gua (袿) is also a form of changru. Other forms of changru included the shuhe (裋褐; 'coarse clothing') which jiaolingyouren and could reach the knee- or the hip-level.

Other terms, such as daru (大襦; 'outerwear'), shangru (上襦; 'jacket'), and yiru (衣襦), also exist.

==== Shan ====
Illustration of shan (衫) from the Gujin Tushu Jicheng, between 1700 and 1725 AD.

Illustration of shan with a youren round collar (yuanlingshan) and narrow sleeves, decorated with a flower square from the Qing dynasty Gujin Tushu Jicheng.

According to the Ben Cang Gang Mu (本草綱目) written by Li Shizhen's time (1518 – 1593 AD), in ancient times, an unlined short garment, duanru (短襦; 'short jacket'), was called shan (衫); and in the time of Li Shizhen's time, the shan also came to refer to long garments (长衣; 長衣; chángyī; 'long clothes').

The term hanshan (汗衫; 'sweat shirt') typically refers to a form an undershirt.According to Li Shizhen, who quoted the Zhiguzi (炙轂子) by Wang Rui, the hanshan used to called zhongdan (中單), an inner unlined garment; it changed name when the zhongdan of King Han was seeped with sweat when the latter fought with Xiang yu.

==== Ao ====
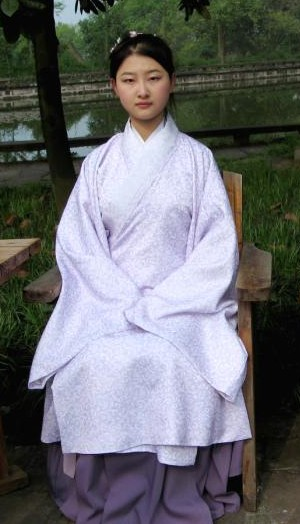
Modern reconstruction of a long jacket called chang ao.

Illustration of an ao decorated with flowers (寶相花裙襖) from the Qing dynasty, Gujin Tushu Jicheng. It is yuanling ao with a round collar which closes to the right

Illustration of ao (襖) from the Qing dynasty Gujin Tushu Jicheng. This ao shows a frontal closure.

The term ao (袄; 襖) appears in a Sui dynasty rime dictionary called Qieyun, published in 601 AD and can be translated as "padded coat", but it can also refer to a lined upper garment. The term ao was sometimes used to refer to thicker forms of jacket which could be used as winter clothing. A jia ao (夹袄), for example, was a lined jacket which was used by Han Chinese women as winter clothing; the jia ao was typically worn on top of a long-length qun underneath.

=== Xi/ zhe ===
The term xi (褶; 'coat'), sometimes pronounced zhe (褶), also exists and is typically associated with the upper garment worn in military clothing called kuzhe/kuxi.

== Construction and design ==
=== Collar designs ===
The ru is a form of jacket or coat, which typically closes to the right and is described as being youren. However, some styles can be found with a front central opening which can be referred as duijin (对领) or zhiling (直领). The ru can also be classified as jiaolingyouren when it is cross-collared closing on the right side, dajin or xiejin when it has an overlapping big oblique lapel, pianjin when it has a slanted, big lapel, fangling when it is squared collared, and yuanling when it is round collared. It can also be found with or without a standing collar, which is referred as liling or shuling. The standing collars started to be incorporated in upper garments by the late Ming dynasty.

=== Bodice ===
The length of the bodice may vary; it can be waist-length or knee-length.

Slits can also be found at both sides of the lower hems of the bodice.

=== Sleeves ===
The length of the sleeves can vary in length, such as wrist-length and elbow length.

The shapes of the sleeves can also vary, such as big sleeves, narrow sleeves, large cuffs, mandarin sleeves, flared sleeves.

== Cultural significance ==
=== Symbol of Chinese civilization ===
Clothing style which overlaps and closes to the right originated in China. Chinese robes and jackets must cover the right part in a style called yòurèn (右衽; 'right lapel'). The youren closure is an important symbol of the Han Chinese ethnicity. The jiāolǐngyòurèn yī (交領右衽 衣) had been one of the major symbols of the Sino Kingdom, and eventually spread throughout Asia.

==== Composition of jiaolingyouren yi ====
The structure of the jiāolǐngyòurèn yī (交領右衽 衣) may have some differences and variations in terms of features depending on time period and styles of upper garment. For example, a style of Ming dynasty jiaolingyouren yi have the following features:

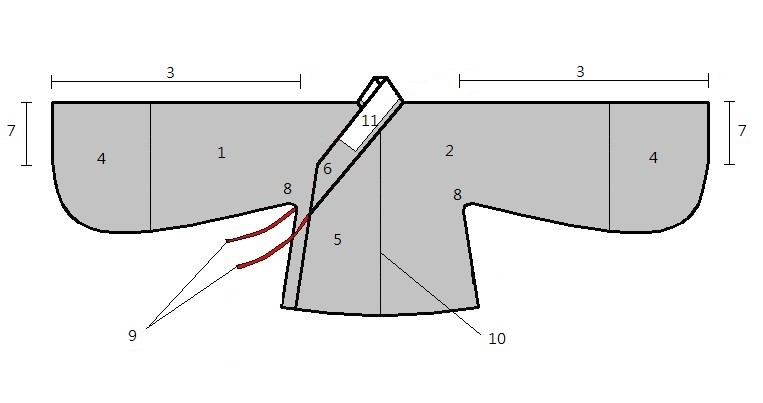
Schema describing the different parts of a jiaolingyouren yi (Front view). The structure of this upper garment have some features which are specific to the style worn in the Ming dynasty

1. Left side of the garment;
2. Right side of the garment;
3. Xiu (袖) - Sleeves; it is composed of the side of the body and the mei; sleeves can come in various shapes and each shape has a specific name to describe it based on its shape;
4. Mei (袂) - a panel of fabric attached to the left side of the garment, between the Ge (袼) and the Qu (袪);
5. Ren (衽) - A side panel forming the chest part area; the left-side covers the right-side, youren (右衽);
6. Jin (襟) - lapel (can be found on both sides; the right lapel is hidden);
7. Qu (袪) - Sleeves cuffs for the wrists; can be narrow or loose;
8. Ge (袼) - Sleeve root, the part where the sleeve is attached to the body of the garment;
9. Lacing/ribbons - used to tied and closed the garment;
10. Du (裻) - Middle seam of the clothes; it is where the Ren is sewed to side of the garment; there is also a middle seam at the back of the garments which joins the back of the left and right side of the garment called Zhongfeng (中缝);
11. Huling (护领)- a collar guard, it is shorter than the actual collar and is used to prevent the collar from getting dirty or wear off.

=== Chinese-barbarian dichotomy ===
The traditional way to distinguish between Hufu and Hanfu is by looking at the direction of the collar. In Ancient China, some ethnic minorities had clothing which generally closed on the left side in a way referred as zuǒrèn (左衽; 'left lapel'). This can be found in the Analects where Confucius himself praised Guan Zhong for preventing the weakened Zhou dynasty from becoming barbarians:

"But for Guan Zhong, we should now be wearing our hair unbound, and the lapels of our coats buttoning on the left side [微管仲，吾其被髮左衽矣]"

Unbound hair and coats which were closed on the left side were associated with the clothing customs of the northern nomadic ethnic groups which were considered as barbarians by the Han Chinese. Therefore, the zuoren were used to refer to Hufu and/or refer to the rule of foreign nationalities.

=== Exceptions ===
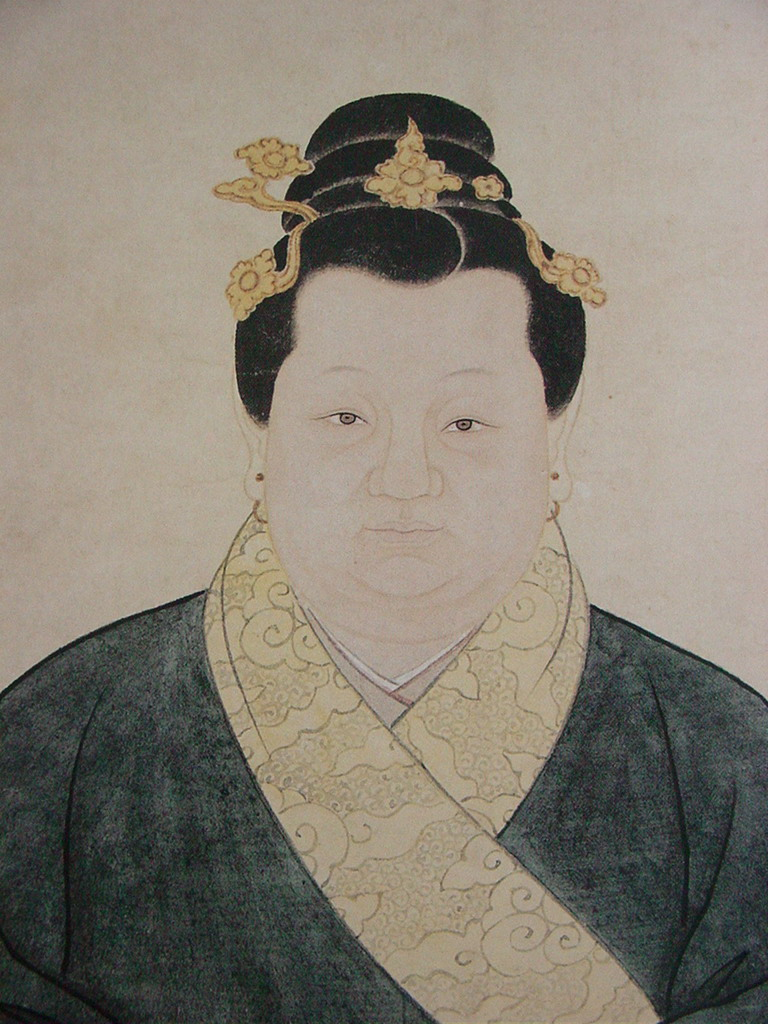
Some paintings of the Ming dynasty depicts the Han Chinese with zuoren garment, an atypical feature

However, the youren rule was not always respected: for example, in some areas (such as Northern Hebei) in the 10th century, some ethnic Han Chinese could also be found wearing zuoren clothing. It was also common for the Han Chinese women to adopt zuoren under the reign of foreign nationalities, such as in the Yuan dynasty; the use of zuoren also continued in some areas of the Ming dynasty despite being Han-Chinese ruled dynasty, which is an atypical feature. Some non-Chinese ethnicities who also adopted Hanfu-style sometimes maintain their zuoren lapels, such as the Khitans in the Liao dynasty.

==== Funeral practices ====
The only moment Han Chinese is supposed to use zuoren is when they dressed their deceased. This is due to ancient Chinese beliefs in the Yin and Yang theory, where it is believed that the left is the Yang aspect and stands for life whereas the right is the Yin which stands for death. Based on this belief, the left lapel needs to be outside (i.e. youren-style) to indicate that the power of Yang is suppressing the Yin, which therefore symbolized the clothing of living people. However, if Yin surpasses Yang (i.e. zuoren-style), then clothing becomes the clothing worn by the deceased. It is therefore typically taboo in Chinese clothing for a living person to wear zuoren.

== History ==
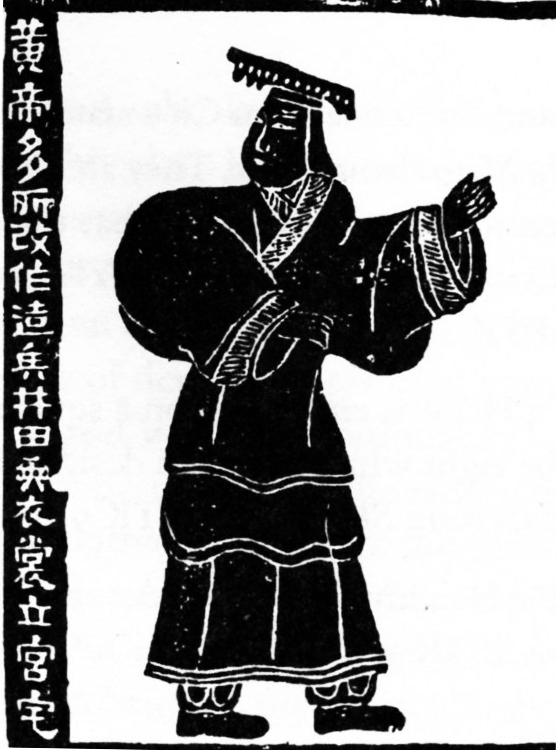
Huangdi wearing yichang, 151 AD.

Clothing style with yòurèn (右衽; 'right lapel') closure originated in China. Prior to the Eastern Han, the ru was the most common form of short robe for both men and women; however, the ru was preferred by women afterwards. The long ru could reach the knee-level whereas the short ru was waist-length. The ru could be found unlined, lined or padded.

=== Shang dynasty ===
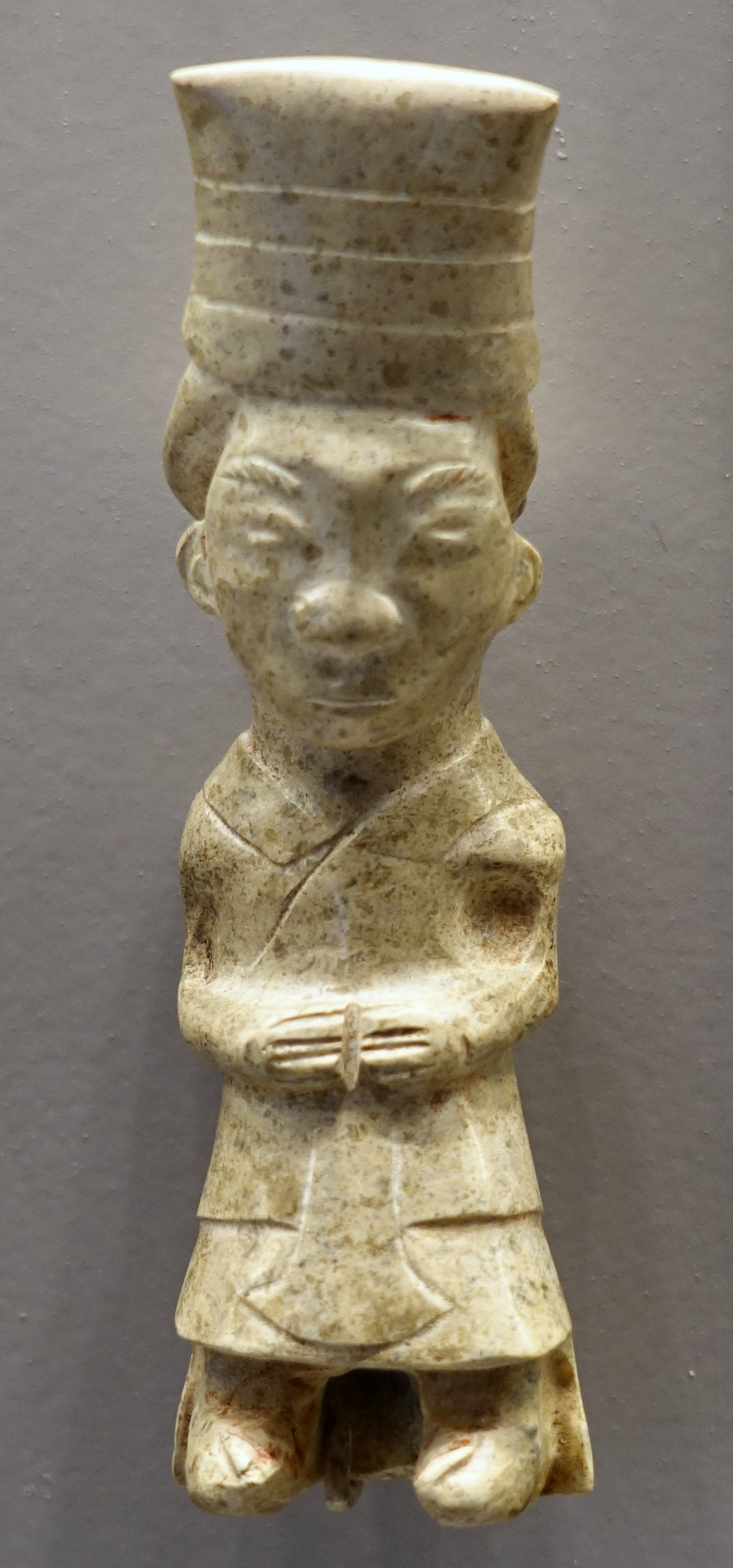
A standing dignitary wearing yichang, consisting of jiaolingyouren yi over chang, Shang dynasty.

The jiaolingyouren yi (交領右衽 衣) started to be worn in the Shang dynasty. According to historical documents and archaeological findings, the basic form of clothing during Shang was yichang.

In the Shang dynasty, the yi was long reaching the knee-level and would be worn over a skirt called chang; the yi worn by slaveholders had tight sleeves and were also closed on the right side following the youren-style.

=== Zhou dynasty ===
In the Zhou dynasty, there were various forms of yi as a generic term of upper garments. A typical form of yi was the ru. The ru had different names in this period depending on its characteristics such as length and lining: gua referred to the long-length ru; yaoru (腰襦; 'waist jacket') referred to the short-length ru; furu referred to the ru with a lining and was therefore suitable to protect its wearer from the cold in winter if it was filled with silk or flax; the furu was similar to the paofu in form.

=== Han dynasty and Three Kingdom period ===
In the Han dynasty, short waist-length ru could be worn with trousers or skirts by men and women respectively. (Note: See main pages ruqun and shanku for more details)

In the Han and Wei dynasties, the sleeves of the ru could be wide or narrow; the ru was closed to the right. A form of shan which appeared in the Han and Wei period was a new type of gown which had equal front pieces which were straight instead of being jiaolingyouren and was fastened with a string; it was also a form of unlined upper garment with straight sleeves and wide cuffs. This shan was worn by men and women and became popular as it was more convenient for wearing.

Jiaolingyouren upper garments

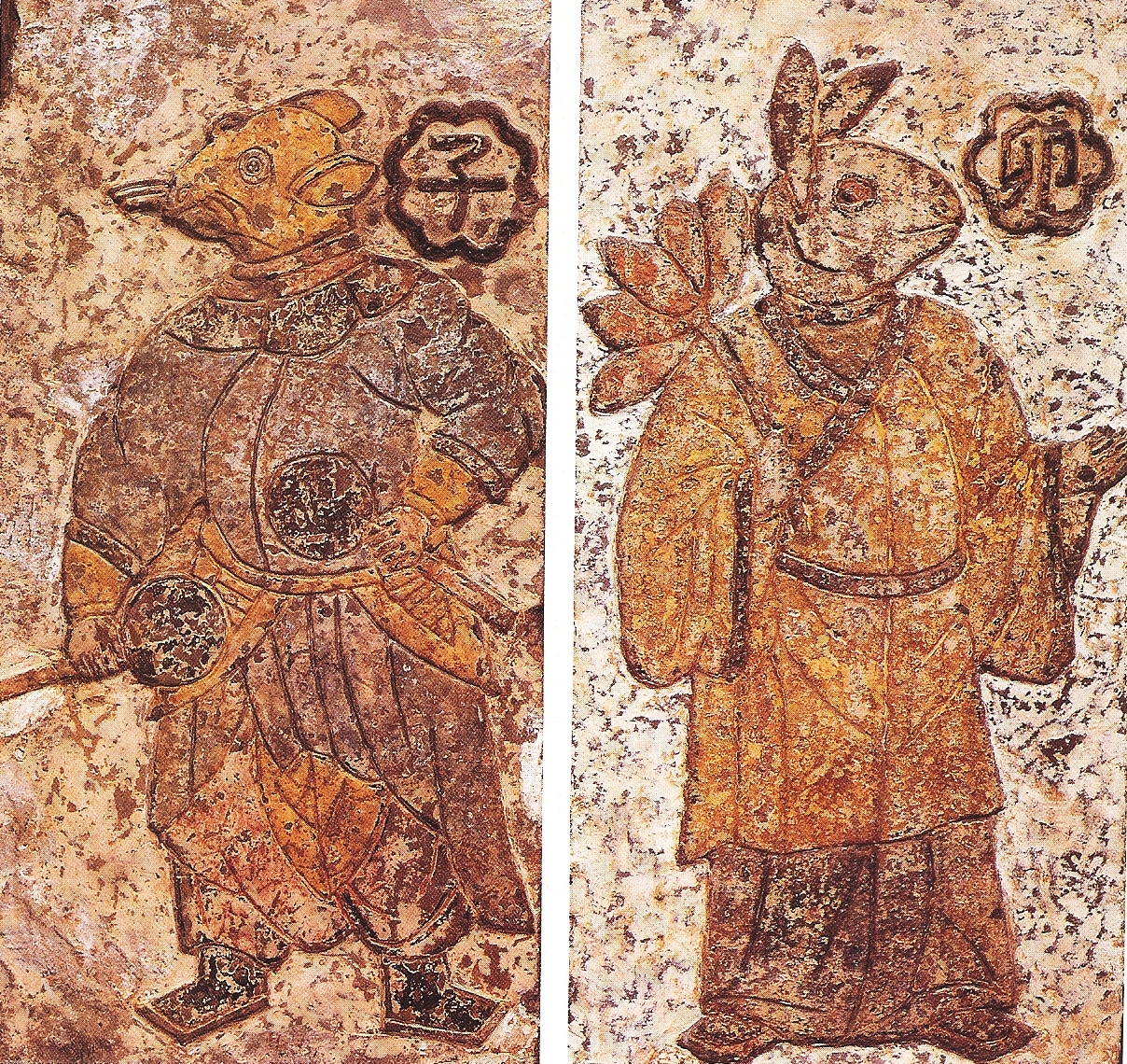
Guardians of day and night, Han dynasty.

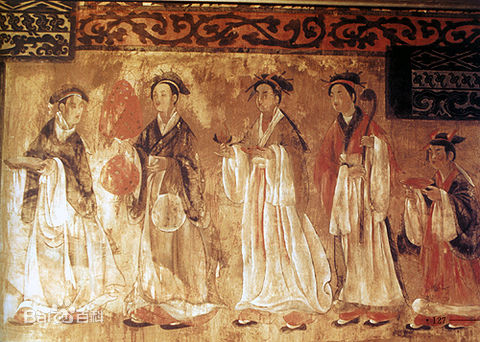
Women wearing jacket (ru) under their skirts. Eastern Han.

=== Jin dynasty, Northern and Southern dynasties period ===
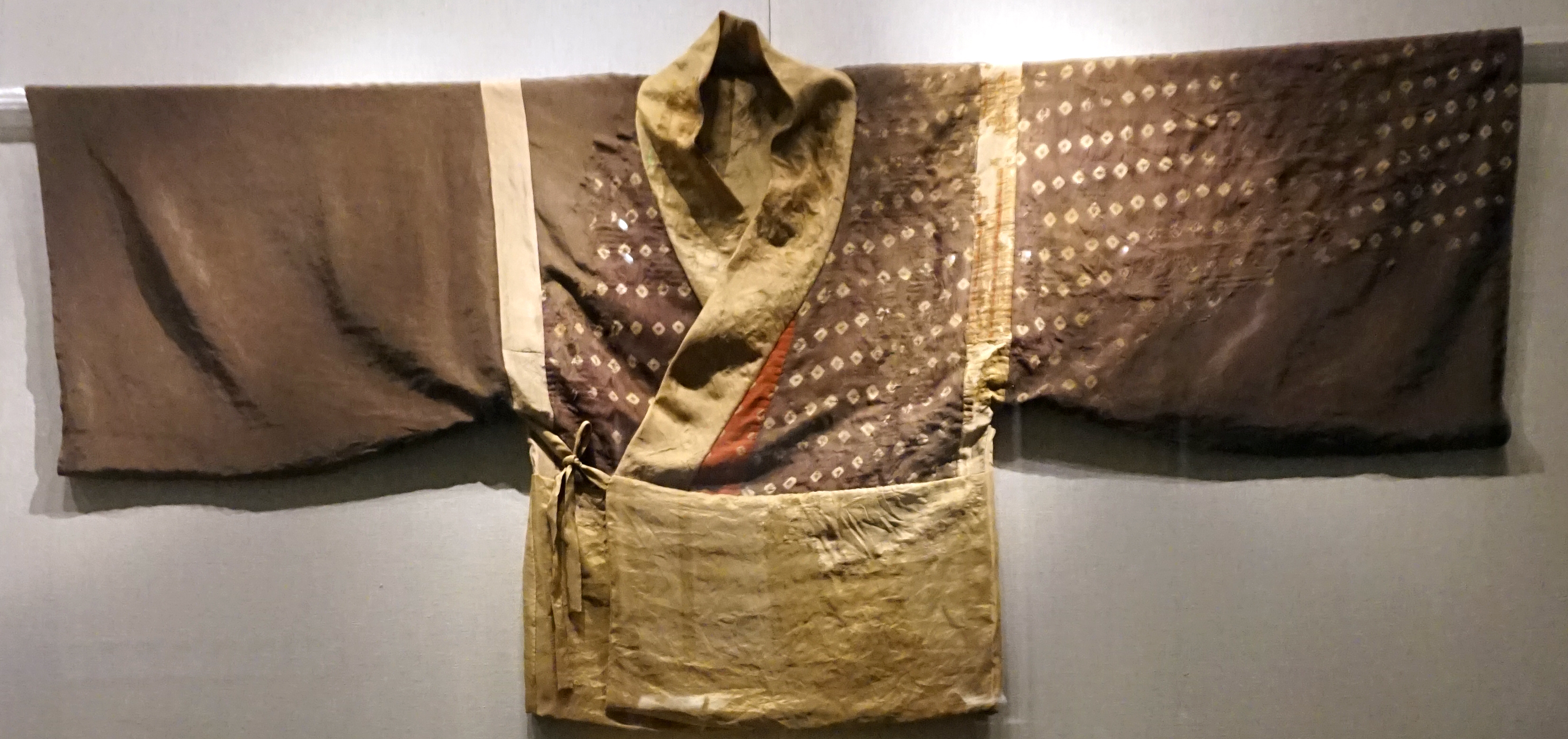
A ru, Former Qin, Sixteen Kingdoms.

=== Sui and Tang dynasties ===
==== Tang dynasty ====
The ru, shan, and ao were common garment items for women in the Tang dynasty. The ru (as a short jacket) and shan (as an unlined short robe) were used for ceremonial and daily clothing by women. Some jackets in Tang dynasty could be found with narrow sleeves, while other upper garments could be found with loose sleeves. The Tang dynasty ru could also be a tight jacket or a cotton-padded jacket, which could have embroidered golden line as embellishment at the collar and sleeves or could sometimes be decorated with silk damask. Duijin shan were also worn by women in this period; a form of duijin shan was the daxiushan which became popular when the Hufu-style declined in popularity.

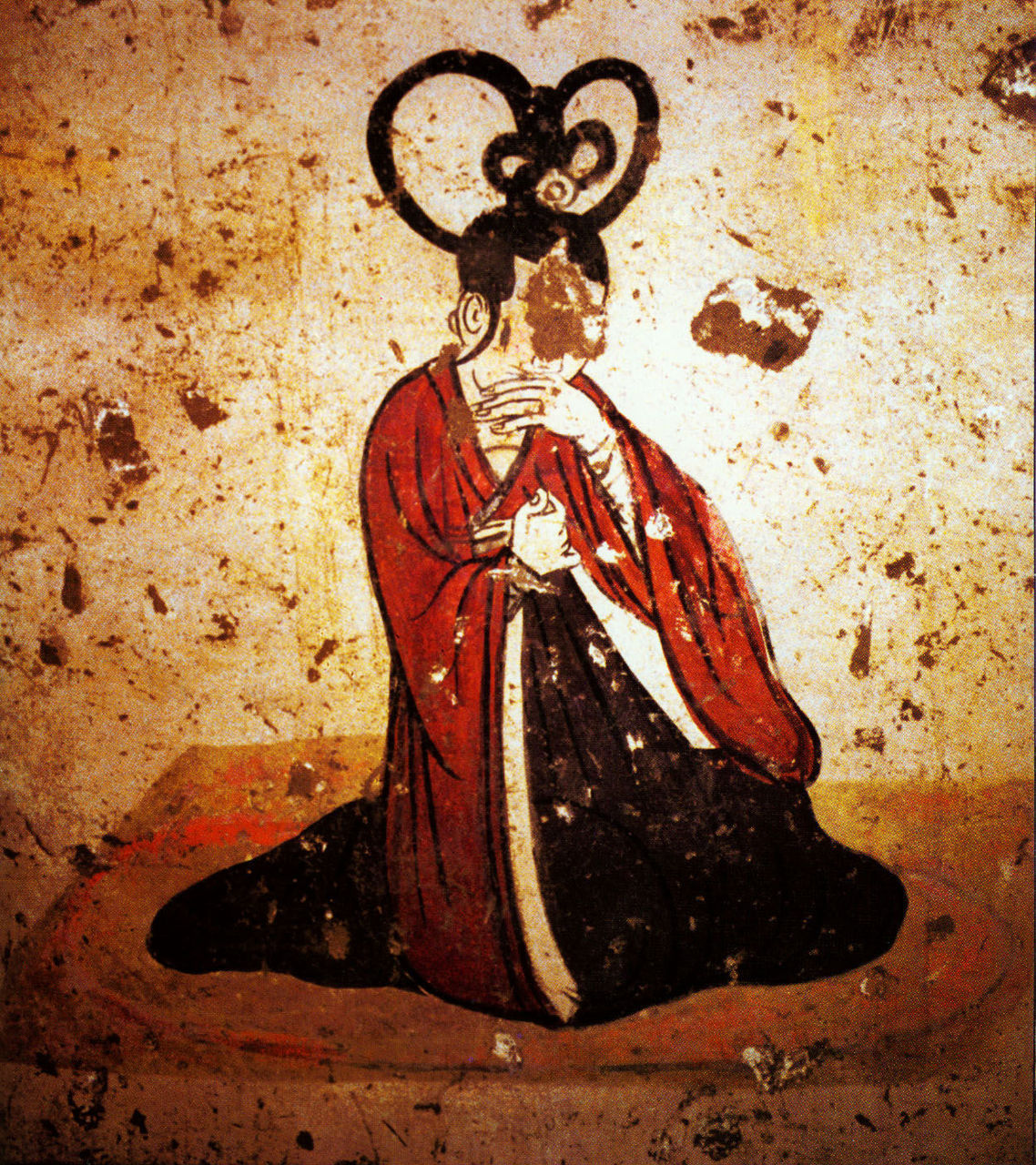
Woman wearing jiaoling youren jacket, Tang dynasty.

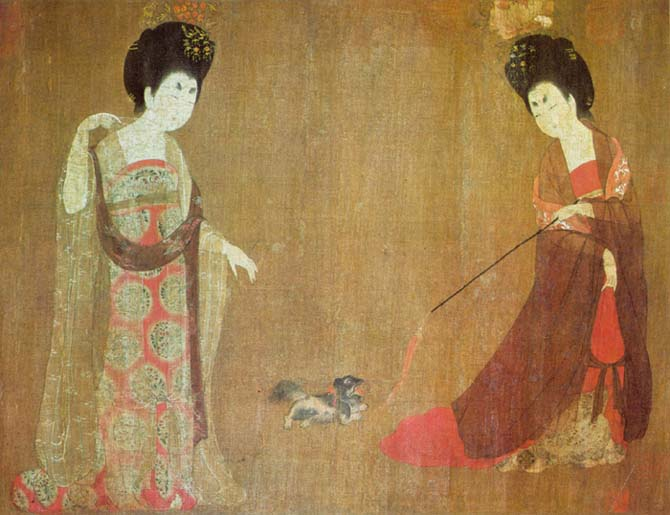
Paintings of women wearing daxiushan (大袖衫) during the Tang dynasty.

=== Song dynasty ===
In the Song dynasty, the daxiushan (shirt with large/broad sleeves) was a form of fashionable formal clothing. Song dynasty, women wore jiaolingyouren jackets and duijin jackets. The short ru was a daily garment item for women; the closures of the short ru were found either on the left or right of the front of the garment.

Clothing worn by the Northern Song dynasty people living in Kaifeng are depicted in the painting Qingming Festival on the River by Zhang Zeduan. This painting depicts the clothing worn by people holding different social status, ranks, and occupation: the jackets worn as outer garments were all short, about knee-length or shorter, when worn by coolies, pedlars, peasants, and boat people and children who peddled dried fruits wore short white shan.

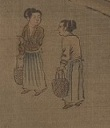
Song dynasty women

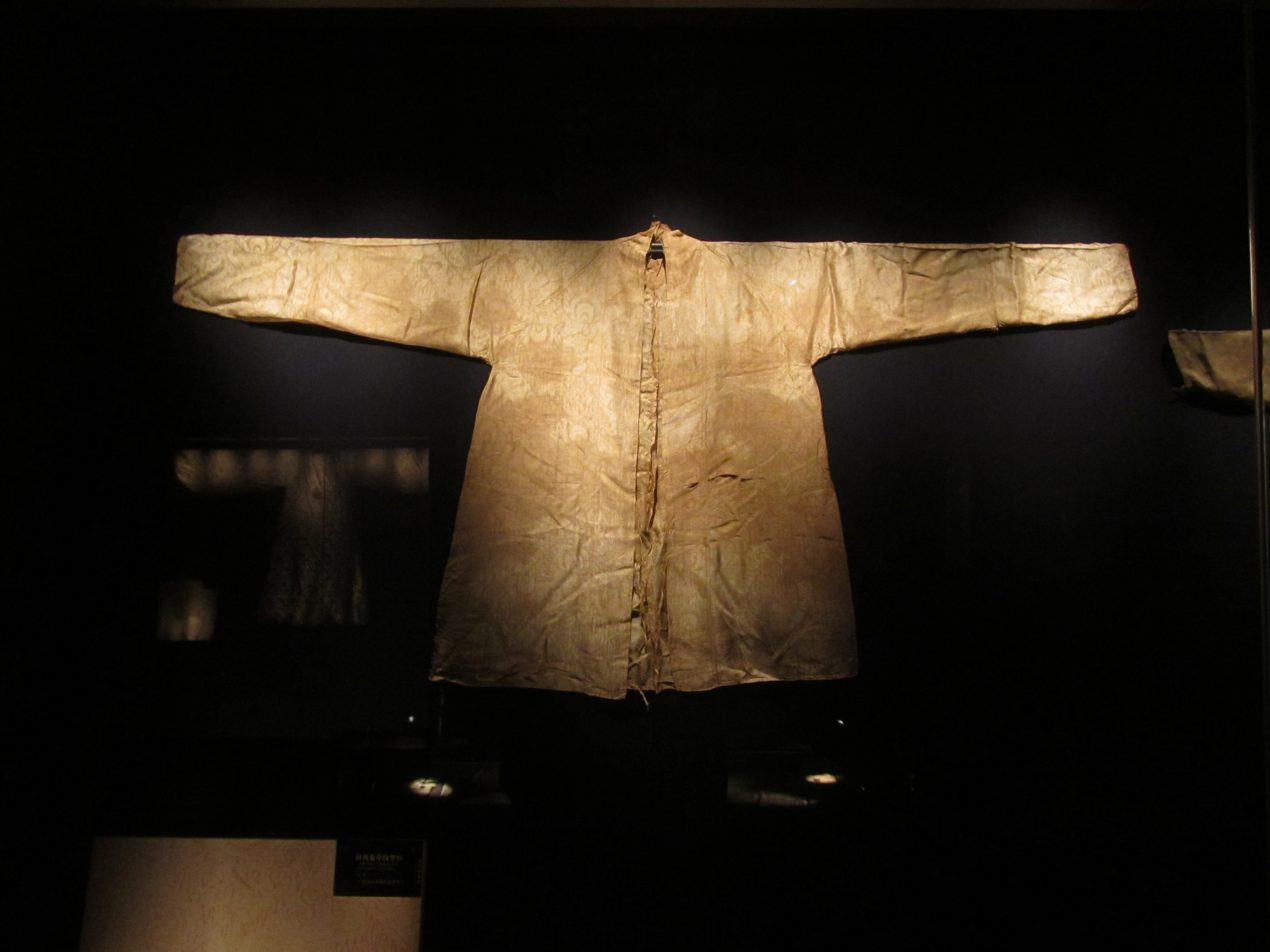
Duijin shan made of luo (罗), Song dynasty.

=== Liao dynasty ===
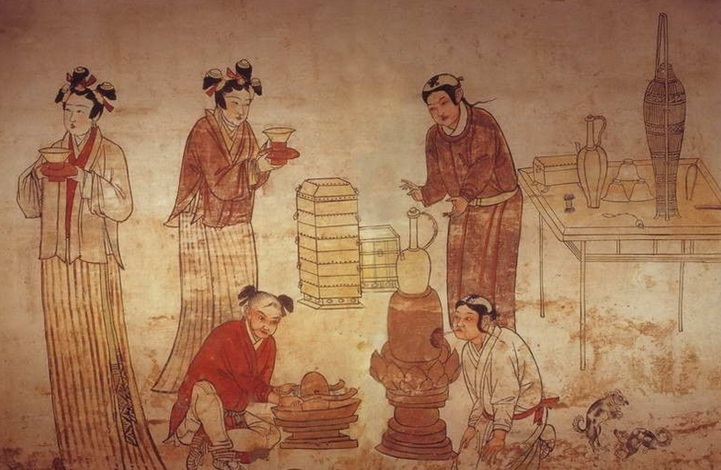
Non-elite Khitan women wearing Song-style fashion, including jiaolingyouren jacket over narrow skirt and beizi.

Song dynasty-style fashion, including jiaolingyouren jackets, continued to be worn by both Han Chinese and non-elite Khitan women in the Liao dynasty; these jackets were waist-length.

=== Yuan dynasty ===
Both the jiaolingyouren and the jiaolingzuoren jackets for women coexisted in the Yuan dynasty. The wearing of zuoren (instead of youren) was common in the Yuan dynasty. Han Chinese women also wore jia ao (夹袄), a form of lined jacket, typically over a long-length qun underneath as winter clothing.

=== Ming dynasty ===
Following the end of the Yuan dynasty, the wearing of zuoren in women's clothing persisted in the Ming dynasty for at least Chinese women who lived in the province of Shanxi. Ming dynasty portrait paintings showing Chinese women dressing in zuoren jackets appeared to be characteristic of ancestral portraits from the province of Shanxi and most likely in the areas neighbouring the province.

In the Ming dynasty, the ao as a long jacket became more prevalent at the expense of the short ru. According to the Discourse of Northern Learning (Korean: 완역정본; Hanja: 北學議; RR: Pukhak ŭi) by Pak Chega (1750–1805) who visited the Qing dynasty in 1778, in the Ming dynasty, Chinese women's upper garment barely covered the waist during the Hongzhi era (1488–1505); their upper garments then gradually became longer and reached below the knee-level during the Zhengde era (1506–1521). Pak Chega based his description of Chinese women's clothing by using the Records of Daily Study (Rizhilu) by Gu Yanwu (1613–1682), a scholar from the late Ming and early Qing dynasties.

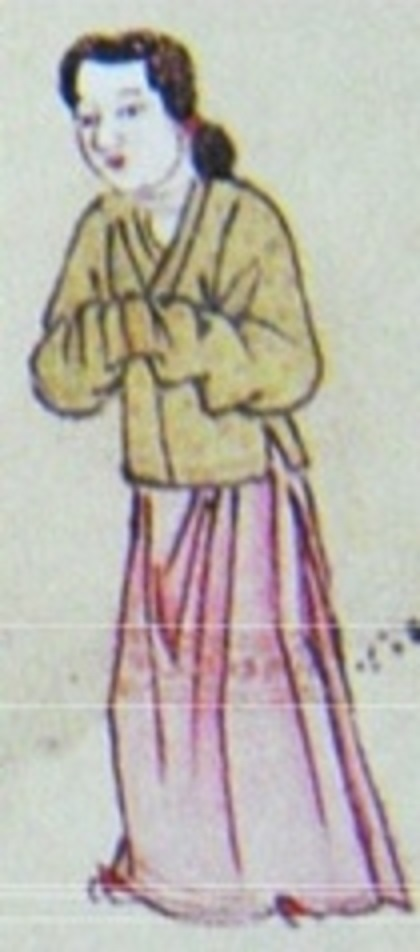
Woman wearing a waist-length jacket, Ming dynasty.

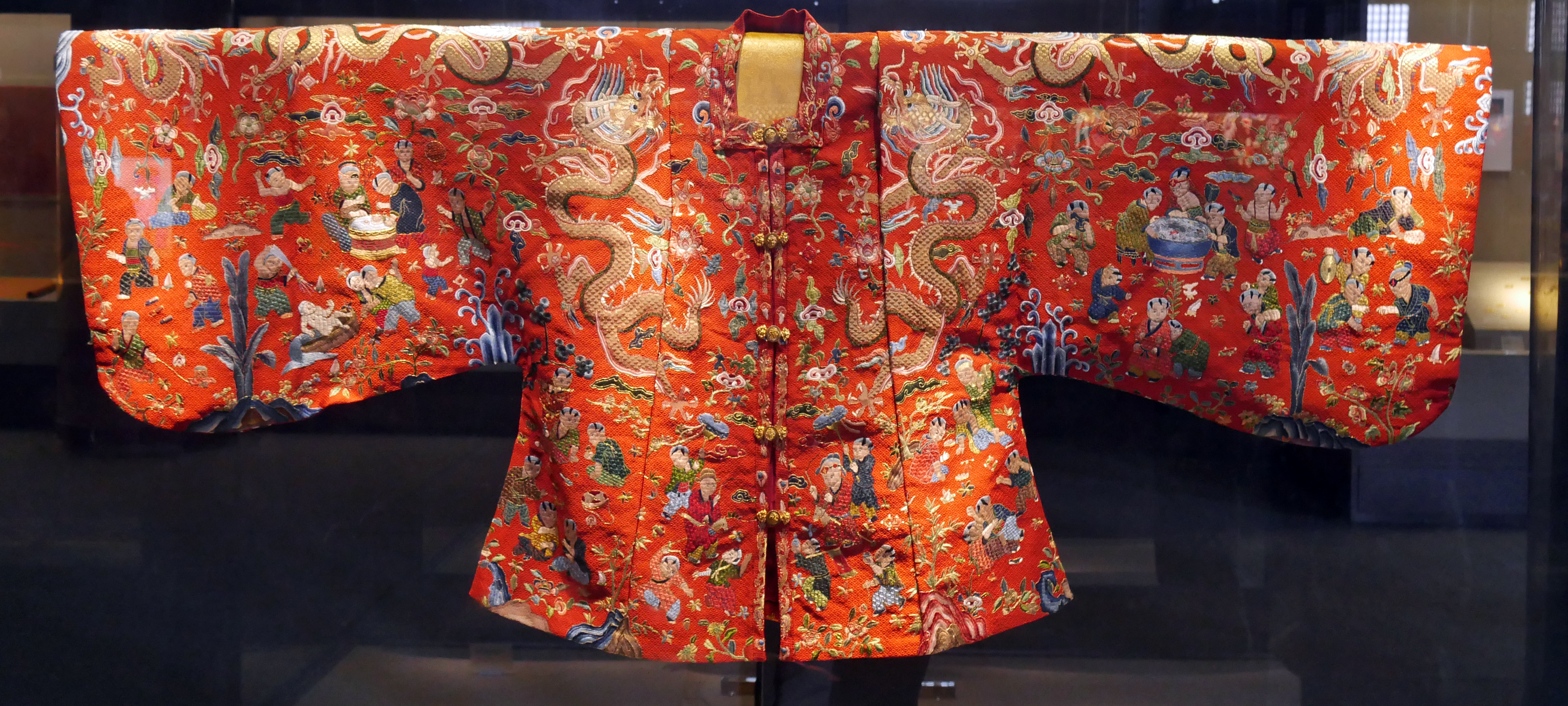
Waist-length fangling ao (square collared jacket), Changling Tomb of the Ming dynasty.

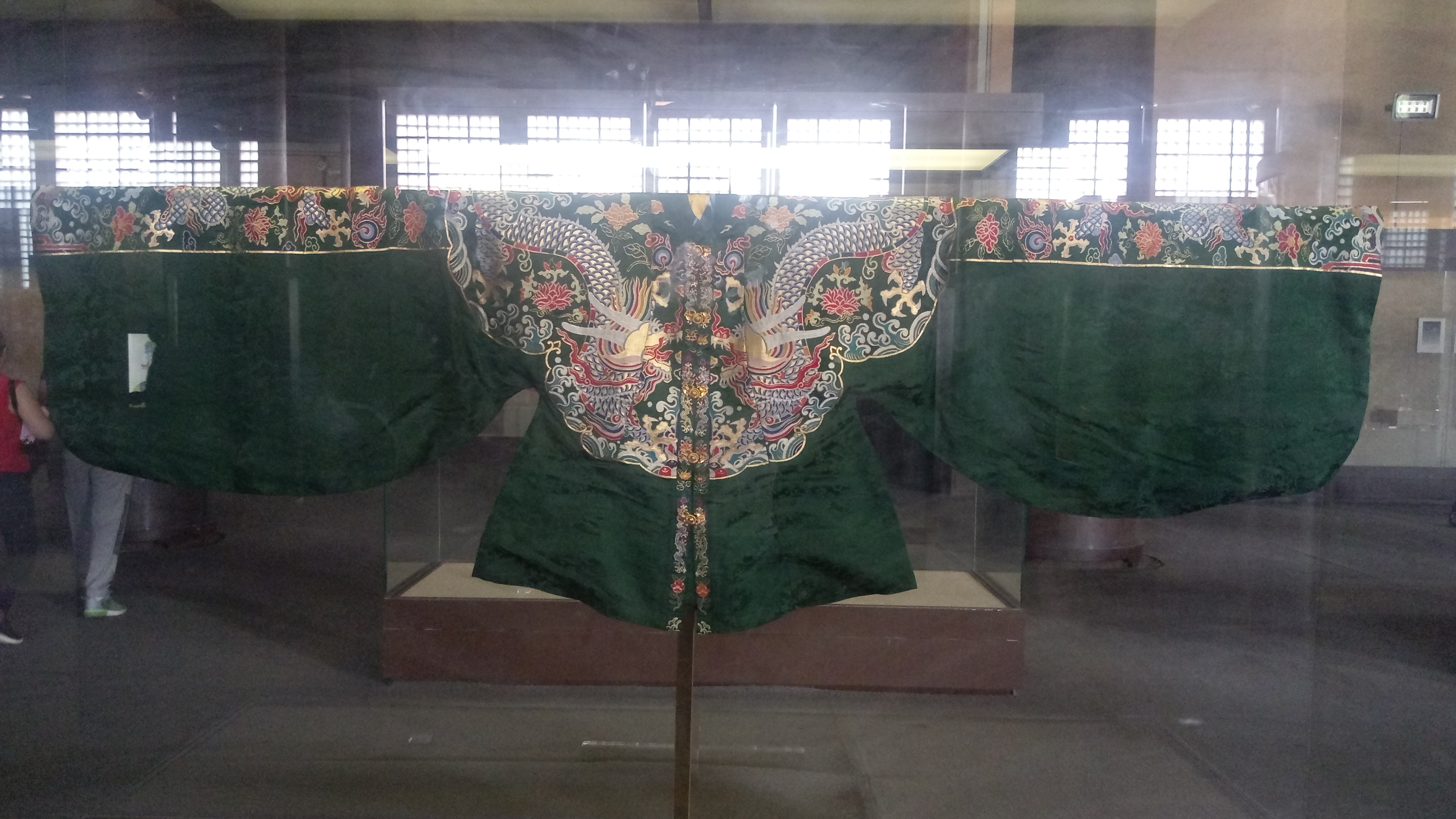
Waist-length duijin ao (lined jacket), Ming dynasty.

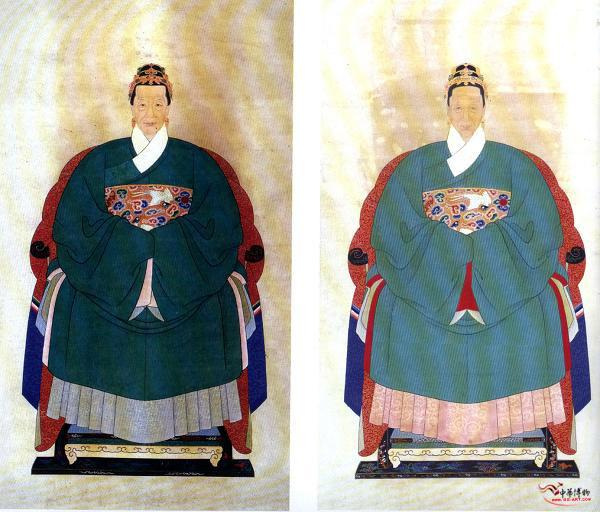
Portrait of women wearing long jiaoling youren jacket (chang'ao) decorated with buzi, Ming dynasty.

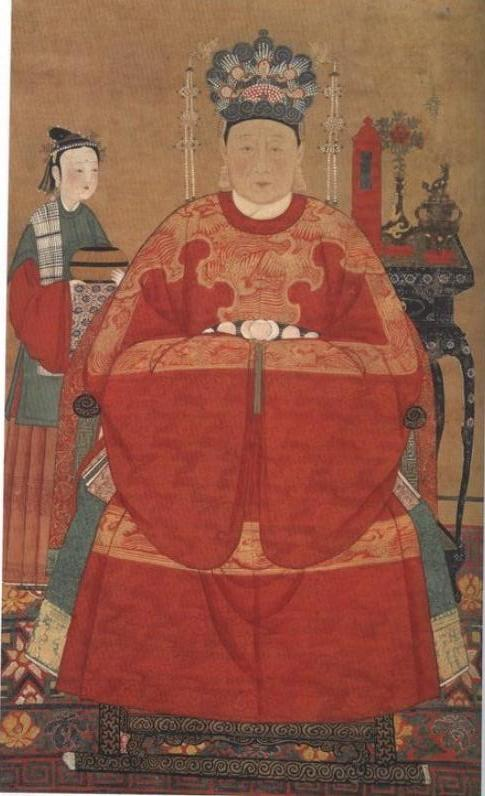
Noble lady wearing a round-collared jacket as upper garment and a skirt as lower garment (front) Lady-in-waiting wearing a short-sleeved round collar jacket with a skirt (left), Ming dynasty.

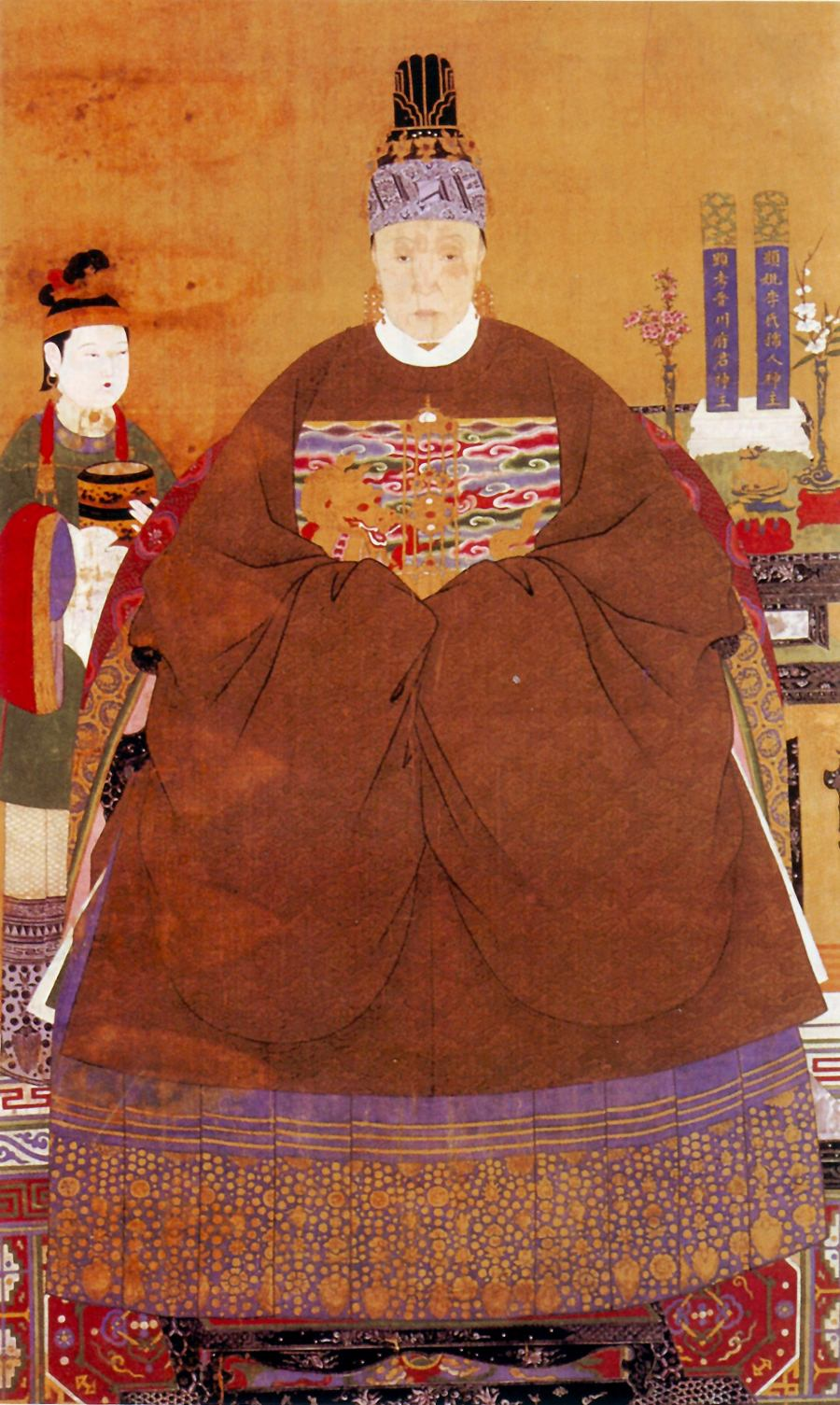
Noble lady wearing a round-collared jacket as upper garment and a skirt as lower garment (front) Lady-in-waiting wearing a short-sleeved round collar jacket with a skirt (left), Ming dynasty.

By the late Ming dynasty, jackets with high collars, known as liling or shuling, started to appear. The standup collar were closed with interlocking buttons made of gold and silver, called zimukou (子母扣). The appearance of interlocking buckle promoted the emergence and the popularity of the standup collar and the Chinese jacket with buttons at the front, and laid the foundation of the use of Chinese knot buckles. In women garments of the Ming dynasty, the standup collar with gold and silver zimukou became one of the most distinctive and popular form of clothing structure; it became commonly used in women's clothing reflecting the conservative concept of Ming women's chastity by keeping their bodies covered and due to the climate changes during the Ming dynasty (i.e. the average temperature was low in China). There were at least two types of high collar jackets in the Ming dynasty: liling duijin shan (立领对襟衫) which is jacket with high collar and closes at the front centrally, and liling dajin changshan (立领大襟长衫) which is a long jacket with stand-up collar, it overlaps from the neck and closes at the right side. The liling dajin changshan is typically worn with a skirt, called mamianqun.

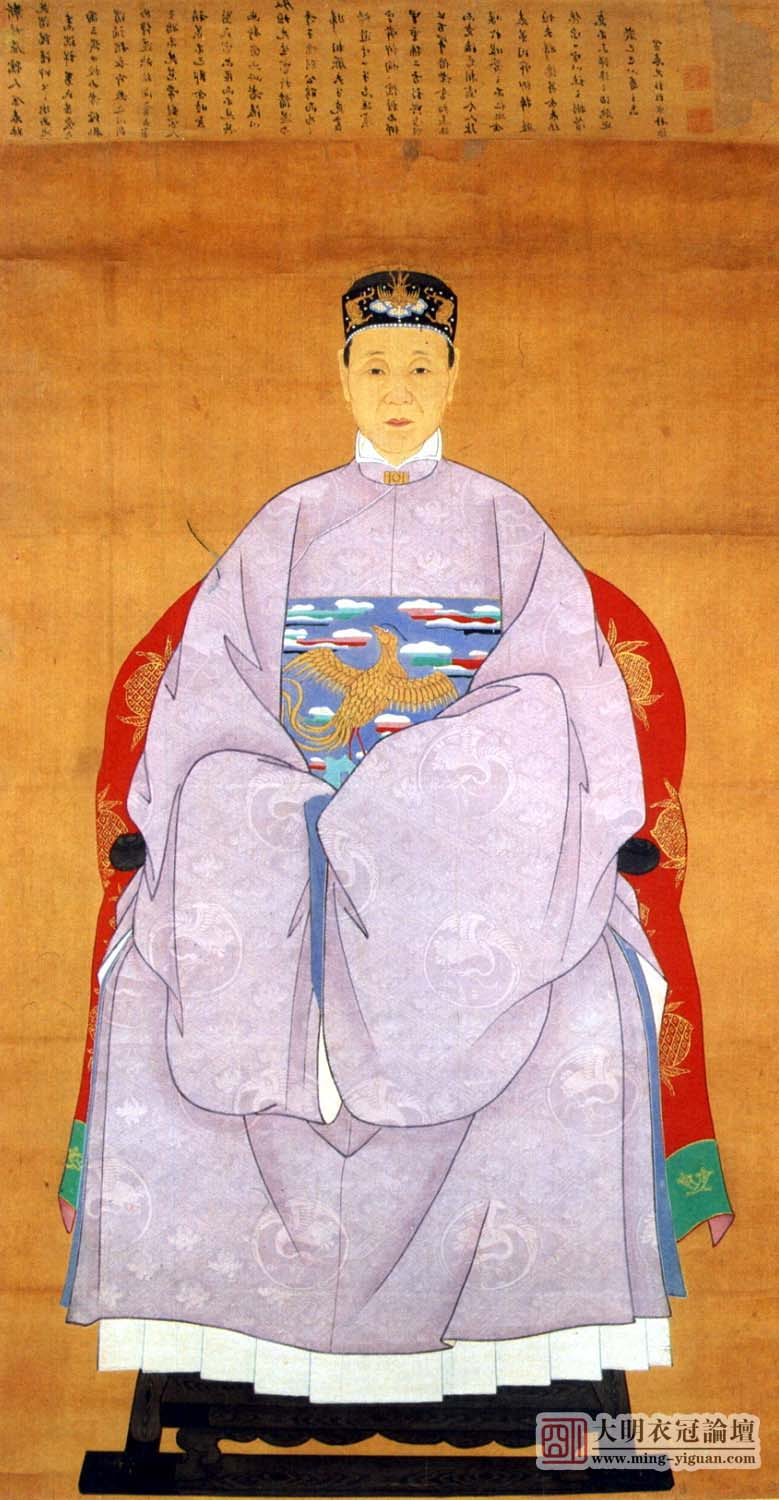
Noble woman wearing a long jacket with right side closure and a high collar. This is style of jacket is referred to as liling dajin changshan (立领大襟长衫).

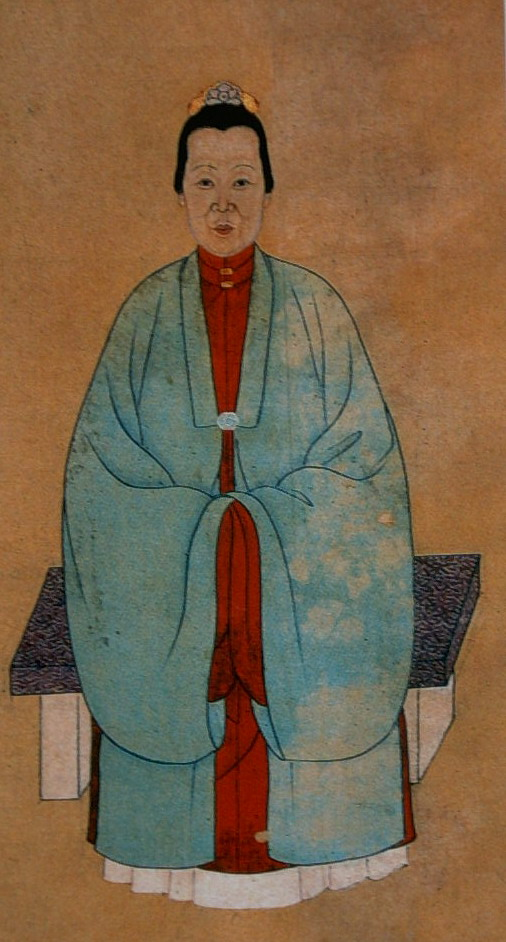
Noble woman wearing a long jacket with right side closure and a high collar, Ming dynasty.

=== Qing dynasty ===
As Han women were not forced to change into Manchu clothing in the Qing dynasty, Han women of the Qing dynasty followed the style of female jacket worn in the Ming dynasty. The Han Chinese women carefully maintained their pure Han Chinese ethnicity and did not wear Manchu clothing. Over time, the Ming dynasty customs were gradually forgotten. The clothing of the Han and the Manchu eventually influenced each other. However, Manchu women and Han Chinese women never emulated each other's clothing; and as a result, by the end of the nineteenth century, Manchu and Han Chinese women had maintained distinctive clothing.

In the early Qing, Han women continued wearing Ming dynasty hanfu; in the South, the jiaoling ao and shan continued to be worn with long skirts by most women while in the North, trousers were more common.

In the mid-Qing clothing, fashionable styles were associated to those worn in the late 16th and early 17th century. According to the Discourse of Northern Learning (Korean: 완역정본; Hanja: 北學議; RR: Pukhak ŭi) by Pak Chega (1750–1805) who visited the Qing dynasty in 1778, Chinese women wore upper and lower garments which were similar to those worn in ancient paintings. Pak described the jackets had collars which were round and narrow and were fastened just below the chin; he also described them as being typically long enough to conceal the entire body although in some cases, the jacket would be long enough to be just below the knee-level. Pak also observed that the Chinese women's clothing preserved the old traditions (which were mostly intact) and which he contrasted with the Joseon women's clothing trend which he claimed to be taking more after Mongolian in style, an influence which he attributed to the close relationship between Goryeo and the Yuan dynasty and continued to exist in Joseon during his lifetime.

After the Mid-Qing dynasty, Manchu clothing, called qizhuang, started to influence the women's hanfu. In the late 18th and 19th century, there was a dramatic shift in fashion aesthetics. New silhouettes were recorded in various pictorial and written sources, which were different from those worn in the Ming dynasty (i.e. loose and long layered jackets and skirts which were more unstructured), with the appearance of wider and more structured forms of Han Chinese women's jackets (including shan, ao, and gua). The trend in this period was characterized on the emphasis on decorative trims and accessories which were modular and could be easily produced, purchased and then applied on the clothing (including robes, jackets, and skirts); those forms of modular features included collars, sleeve-bands and border decorations. The borders decoration in contrasting colours were used throughout the clothing history of China and were recorded early on in history (e.g. in the Liji). During this period, auspicious symbols and narrative scenery were especially made into embroidered roundels and borders and became fashionable in Han Chinese women's clothing; this new trend was an influence of the late imperial secularization of arts and culture on textiles. They were also lavished with embroideries which were based on the Chinese symbolic system, which was itself based on Chinese language, mythology, customs, and literature, and belief system (e.g. Confucianist and Taoist motifs). The wide sleeves used in the upper garment were a heritage of the Ming dynasty and a distinctive feature which differentiated Hanfu from Manchu clothing. In terms of length, the long jacket (ao) was about below the hip level or at the knee level but were never as long as the Manchu robes, it was however longer than the waist-length jacket (yaoru) which appeared to have fallen from popularity during the 18th century.

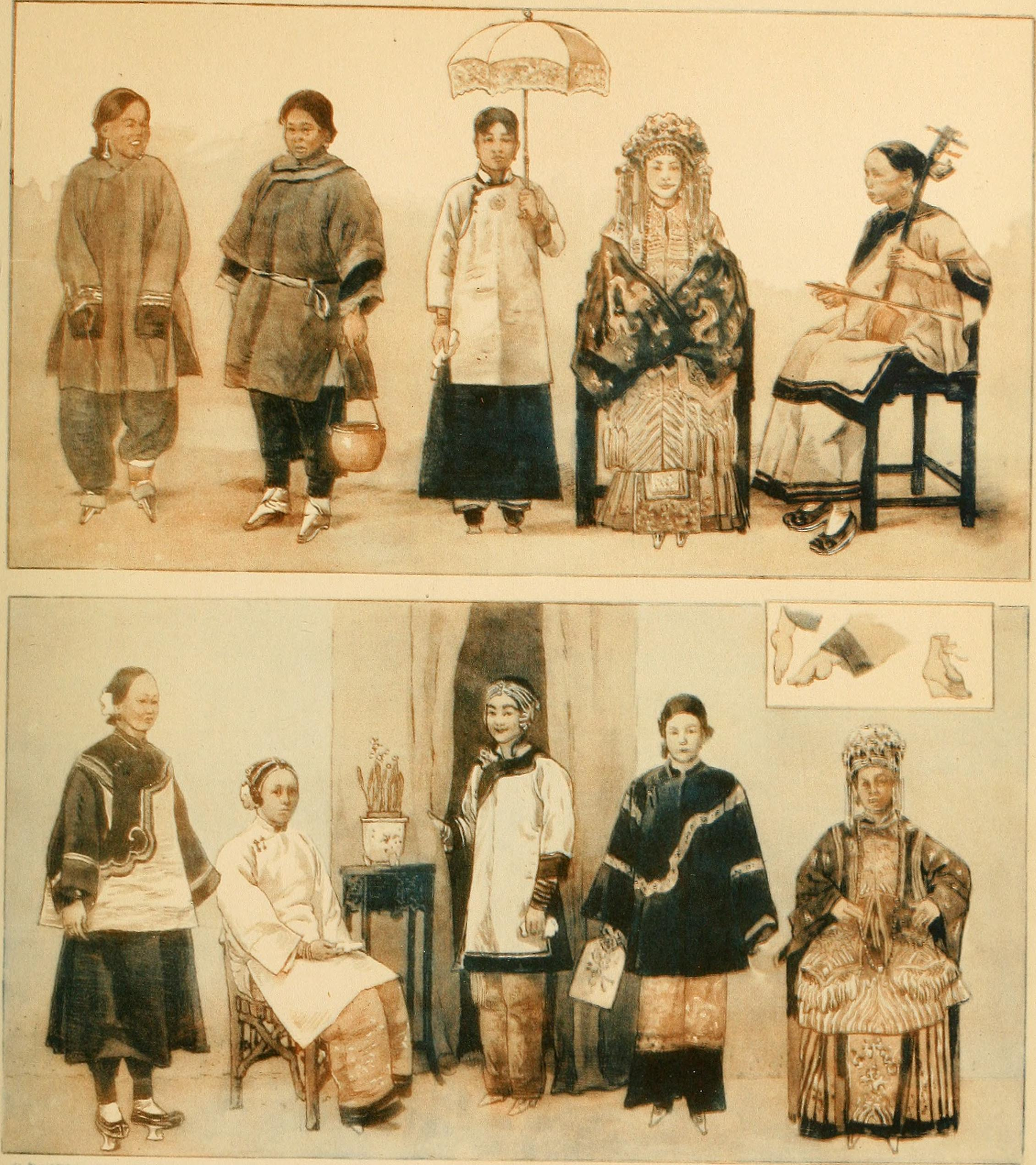
Chinese women wearing different forms of ao, images extracted from Geschichte des Kostüms, published 1905.

The dajin youren ao (大襟右衽袄) continued to be worn. In the late Qing, these dajin youren ao had neither darts nor shoulder stitching; the front and back panels are connected by the shoulder, and the left and right pieces are more or less symmetrical. It has a front centre closure and then curves crossover to the right before secured with frog buttons in a style called pianjin. The front closing, collar, hem, and sleeves cuff have edging of contrasting pipings and side slits. The jackets could also be decorated with yunjian appliqué.

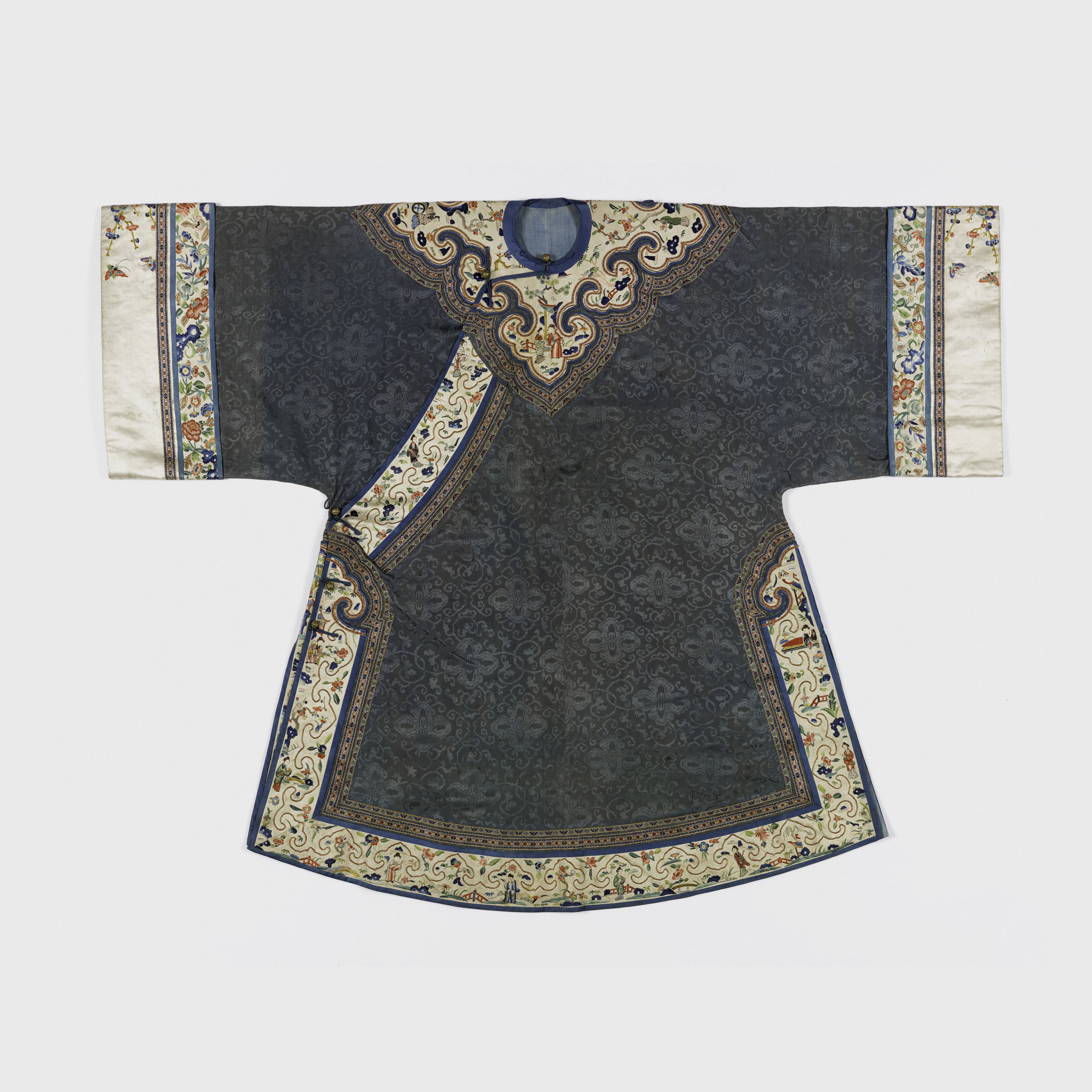
Woman's short coat decorated with a Yunjian appliqué, early 19th century. There is a small round neck opening, and overlap buttoned at neck with two ball buttons and at right side seam with three buttons

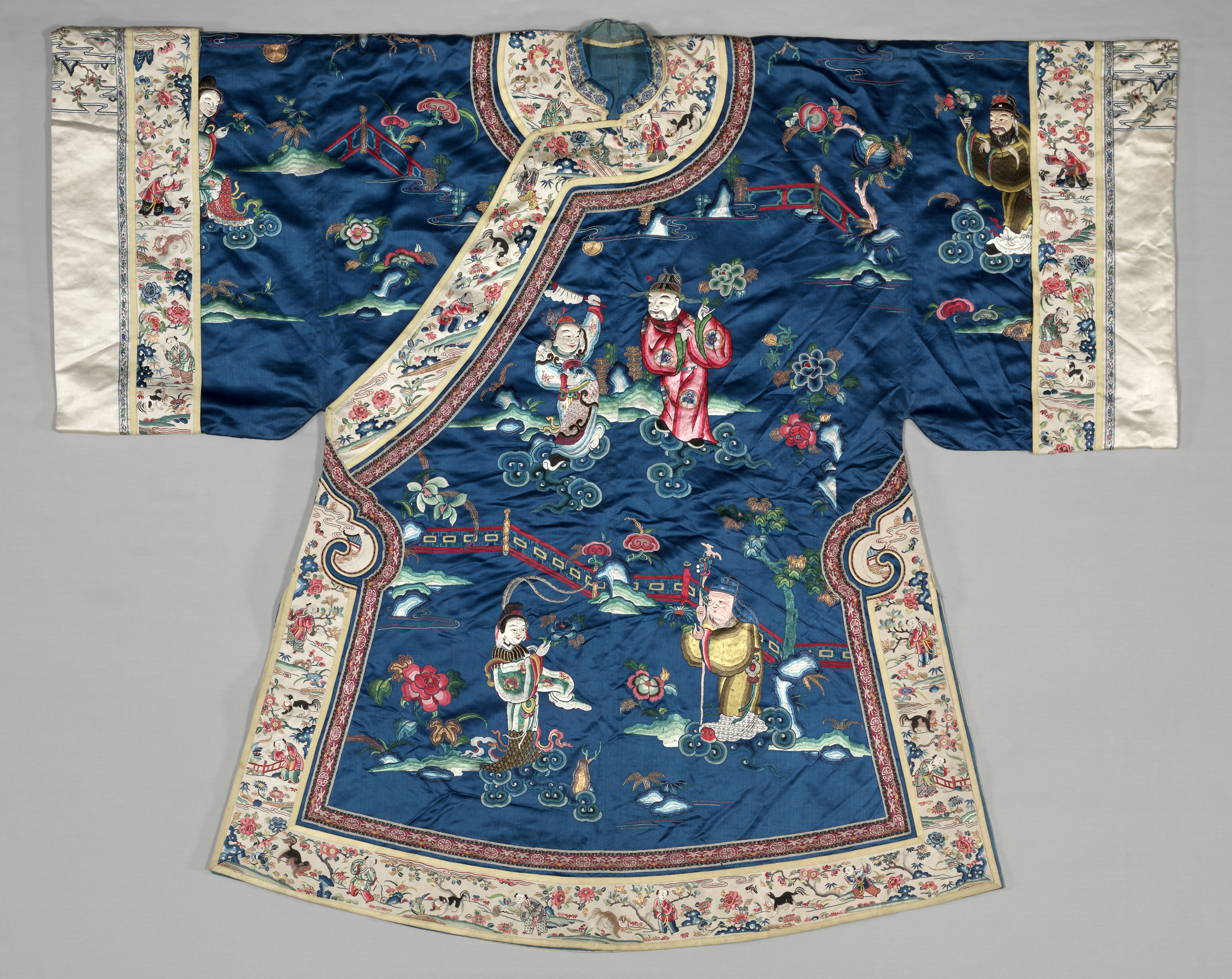
Han women's ao, late 19th century

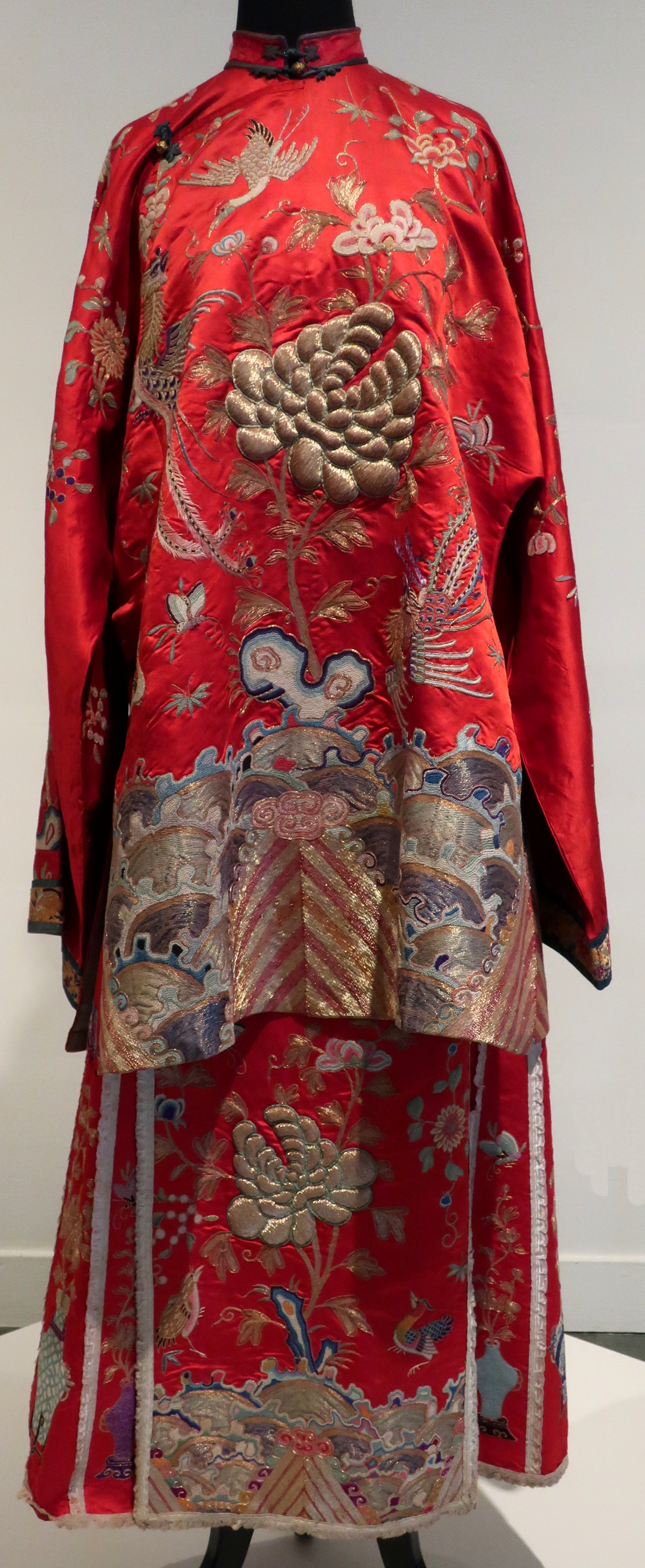
Wedding jacket and skirt (aoqun), c. 1900.

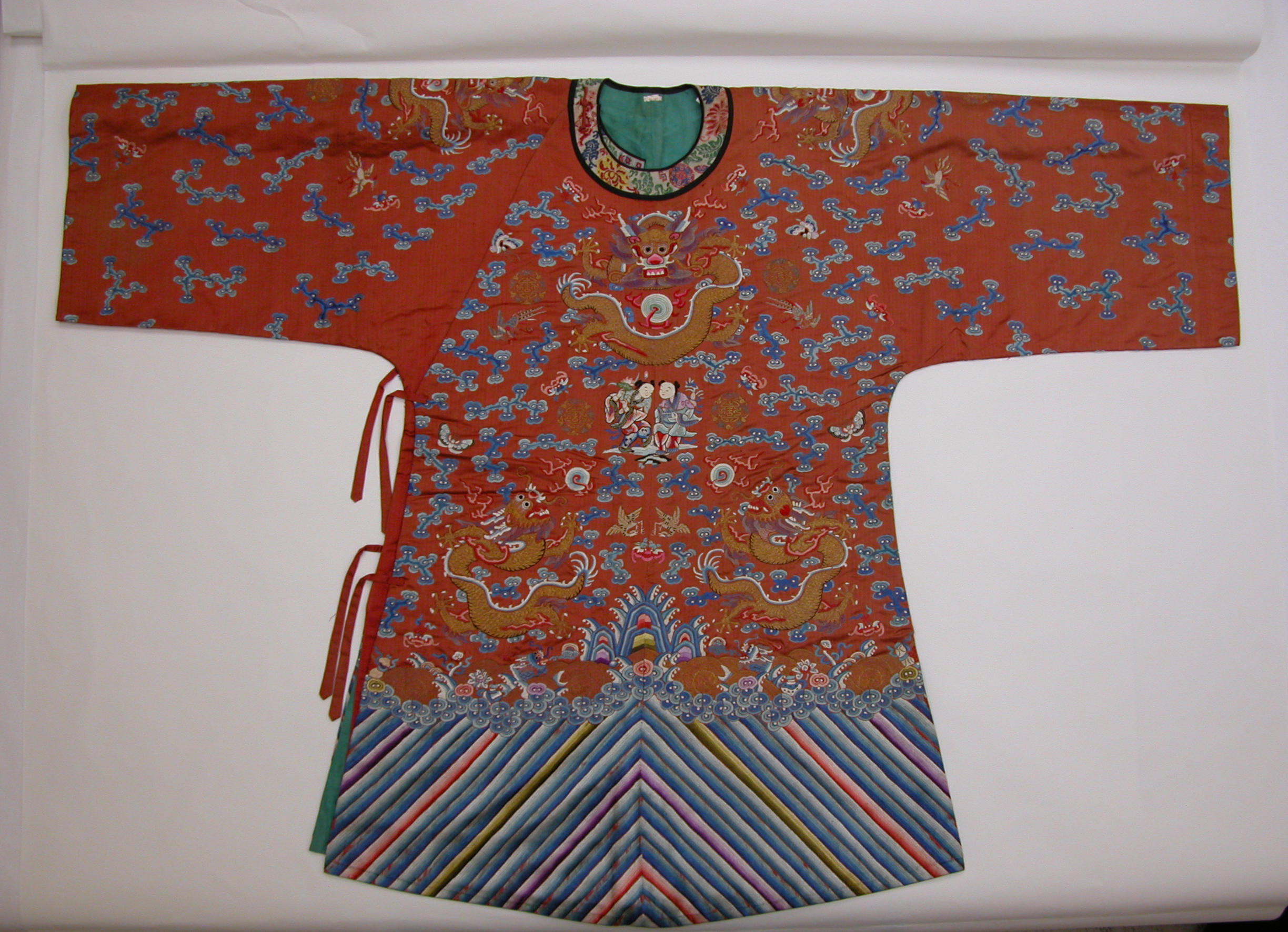
Mangao in the style of a yuanlingshan, Qing dynasty.

There was also a special form of ao called mangao,which was typically used as part of a type of Chinese wedding dress attire.

The duijin ao (jackets with front opening) were also worn. The duijin ao in the 19th century could be round neck with no collar or have small stand-up collars.

The jiaolingyouren yi continued to be worn in the Qing dynasty even in the 19th century by children.

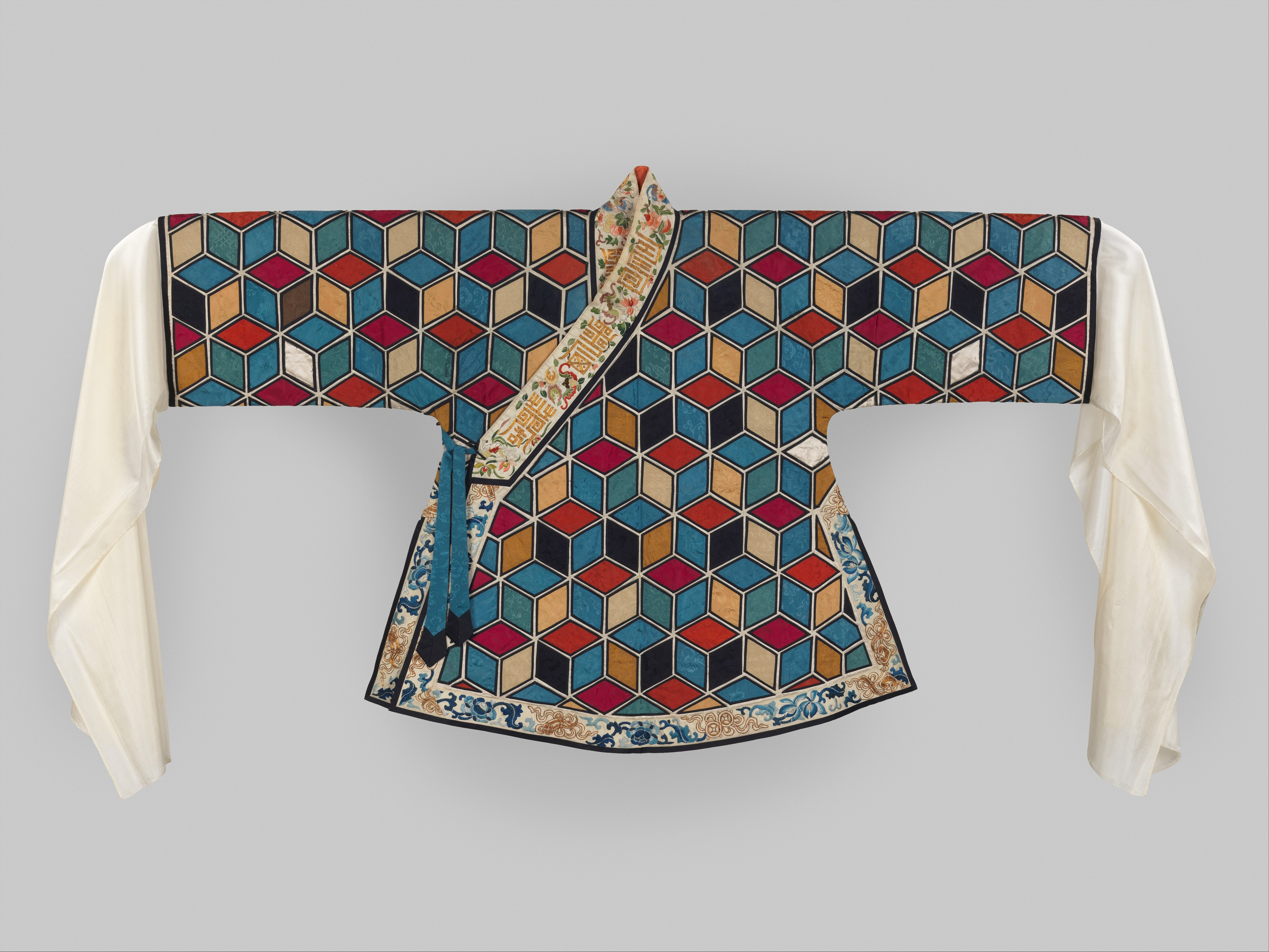
Woman's theatrical jacket, Qing dynasty, 19th century.

=== Republic of China ===
In the early Republic of China, the dajin youren ao were found with narrow sleeves; the length of the sleeves could be found wrist-length, and higher standing collar (e.g. saddle/ingot collar or ear-length collar). These high collars were gradually lowered. After the May 4th Movement, these high collars were abandoned due to their inconvenience. In the 1920s, the jackets had curved lower hem at the waist-hip region and low standing collar; it was a component of the Wenming xinzhuang (文明新裝; 'Civilized new dress'). After the 1930s, these forms of upper garments lost popularity and decreased in use, as they were replaced by qipao and Western dress.

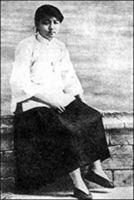
Woman wearing dajin youren jacket (ao) with skirt, 1920.

== 21st century ==
Following the Hanfu movement in 2003, many various forms, shapes, and styles of Hanfu upper garments have reappeared and regained popularity.

21st century

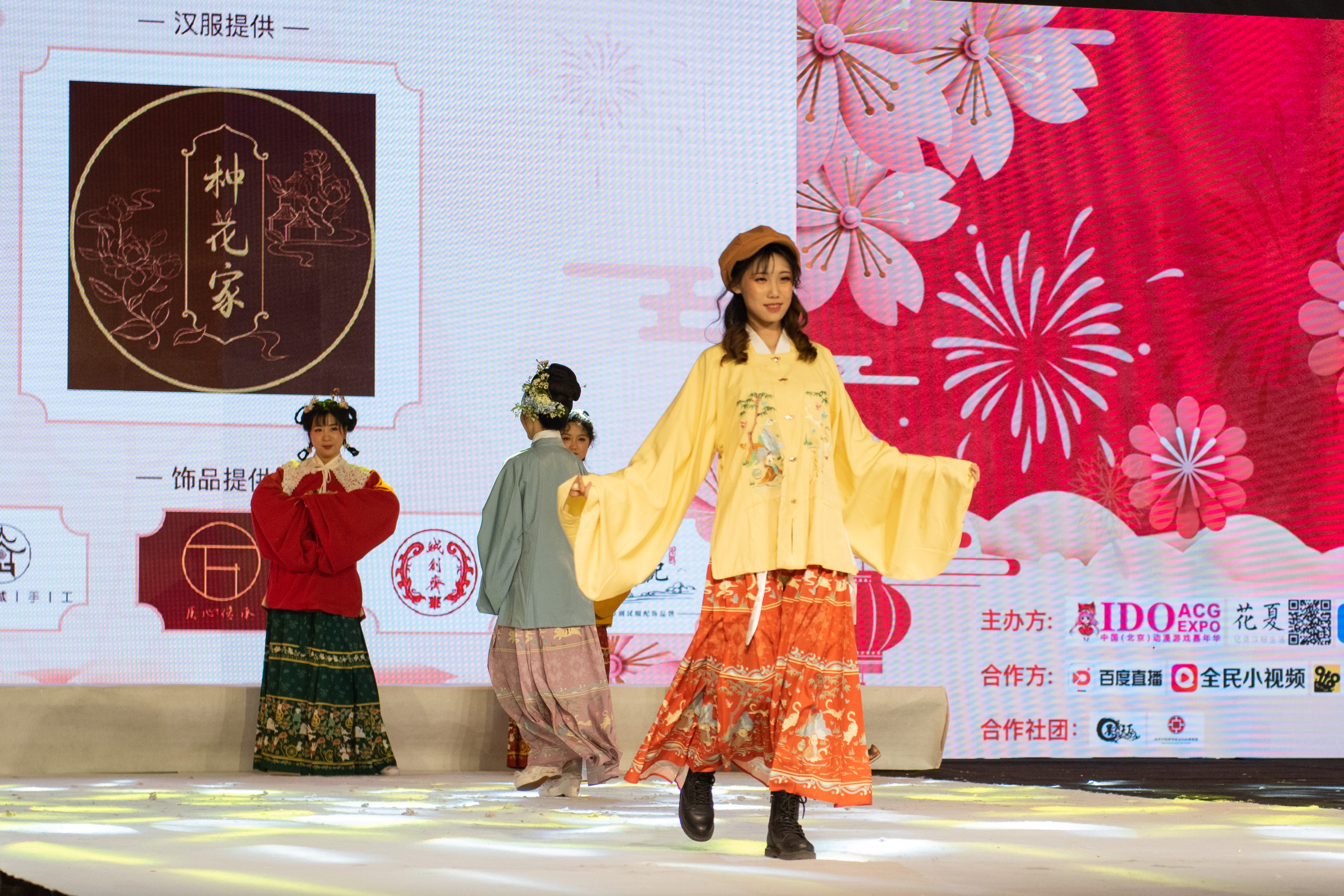
Yellow fangling (square collared) ao, 2020

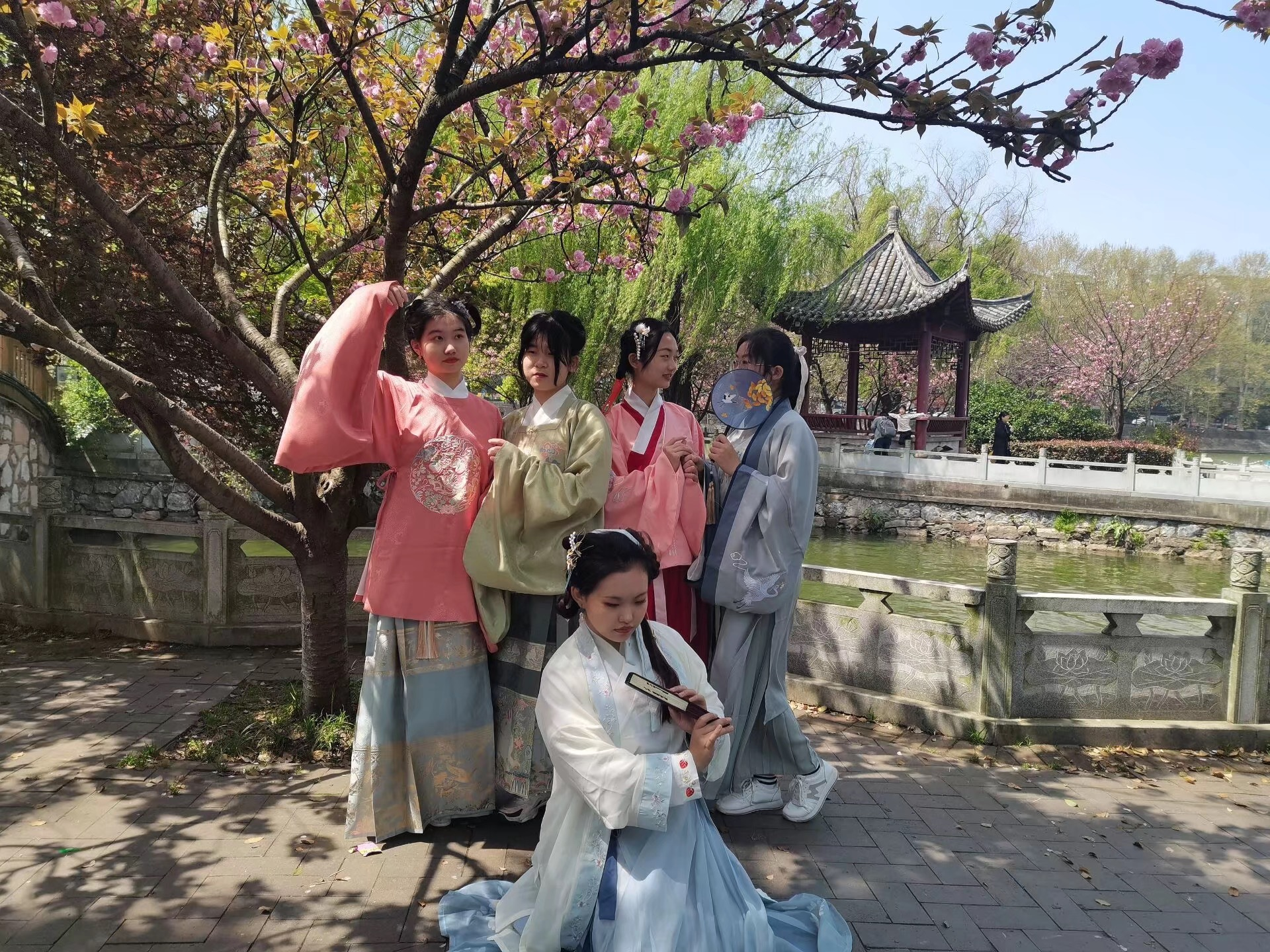
Pink waist-length yuanlingshan with decorative roundels and jiaoling youren ao, Ming style, 2021

== Influences and derivatives ==
=== East Asia ===
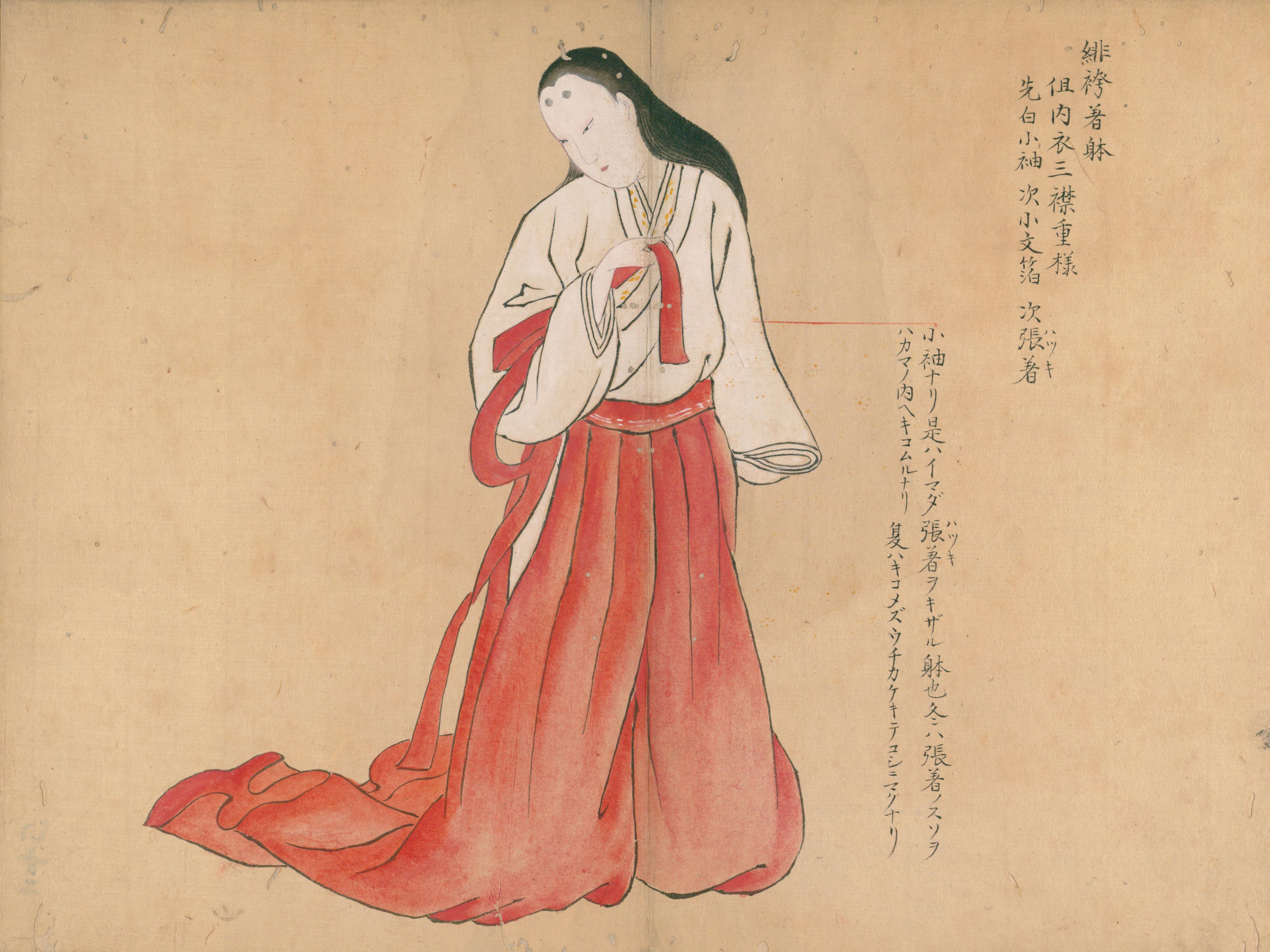
Japanese woman wearing a white kimono and hibakama.

The youren closure was adopted by the Japanese in 718 through the Yoro Code which stipulated that all robes had to be closed from the left to the right in a typical Chinese way

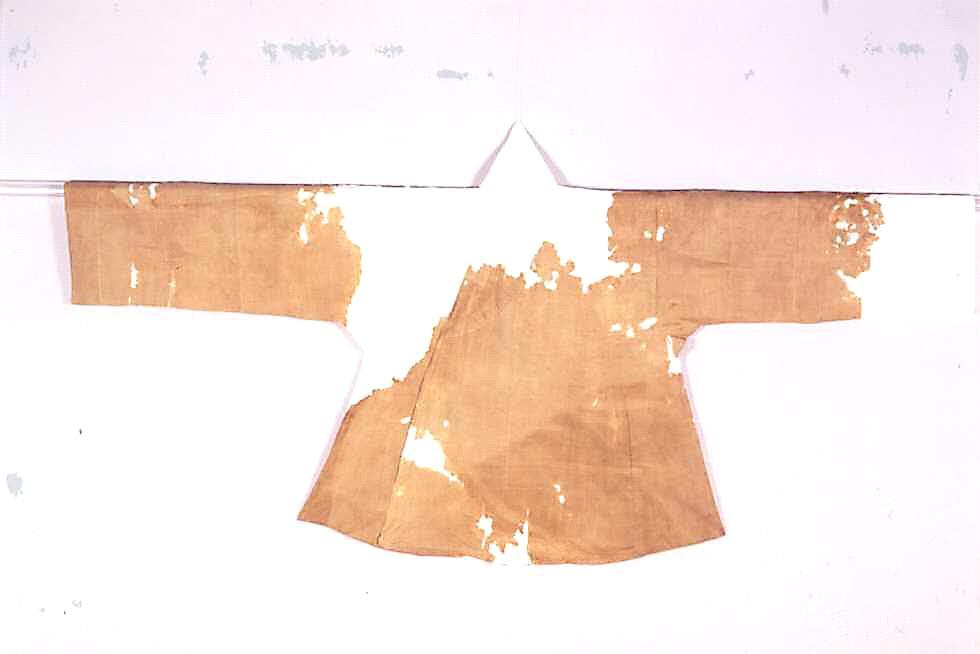
Excavated jeogori which overlaps at the front and closes to the right.

The youren closure was also adopted by the Koreans during the Three Kingdoms period who changed the closure of their jeogori from left to right by imitating Chinese jackets; the right closure is a feature which still exists in present-days hanbok. Initially, the jeogori closed at the front, then switched to a left closure before eventually closing to the right side. Closing the jeogori to the right has become standard practice since the sixth century AD. King Hyonjong of Goryeo had been said to have composed a poem in 1018 stating, "Had it not been for Kang, evermore would our coats on the left be bound", when Kang Kamch'an won against the invading Khitan. The Chinese Ming dynasty also bestowed the ceremonial attire and daily clothing to the Joseon queens from the reign of King Munjong to the reign of King Seonjo whenever a new king was enthroned; the bestowed clothing included Chinese: 襖; pinyin: ao; Korean: 襖; romaja: o, Chinese: 裙; pinyin: qun; Korean: 裙; romaja: gun , and dansam (unlined jacket).

The Vietnamese used to wear the áo giao lĩnh (cross-collared robe) which were identical to those worn by Han Chinese people before adopting the áo ngũ thân), a loose-fitting shirt with a stand-up collar and a diagonal right side closure which run from the neck to the armpit and trousers. The standing-up collar and diagonal right closure are two features inspired by Chinese and Manchu clothing. The change in upper garment style along with the adoption of Chinese-style trousers was decreed by the Nguyễn lords who ruled the south region of Vietnam and who wanted to differentiate their people from those living in the north and were ruled by the Trịnh lords.

Two women wearing áo giao lĩnh in Tonkin around the 1700s.

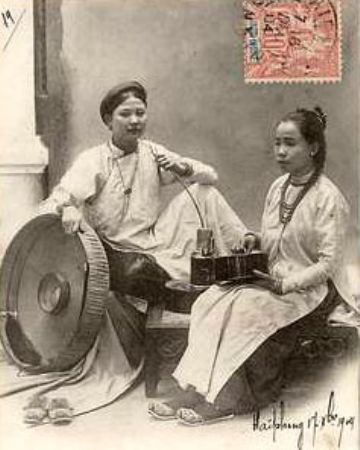
Vietnamese women wearing áo ngũ thân, 1904.

The people of Ryukyu wore cross-collar upper garment called dujin (胴衣; ドゥジン), which was only worn by members of the Ryukyu royal family and by the upper-class warrior families. The old-style dujin was initially more Chinese in style before gradually becoming more Japanese in style.

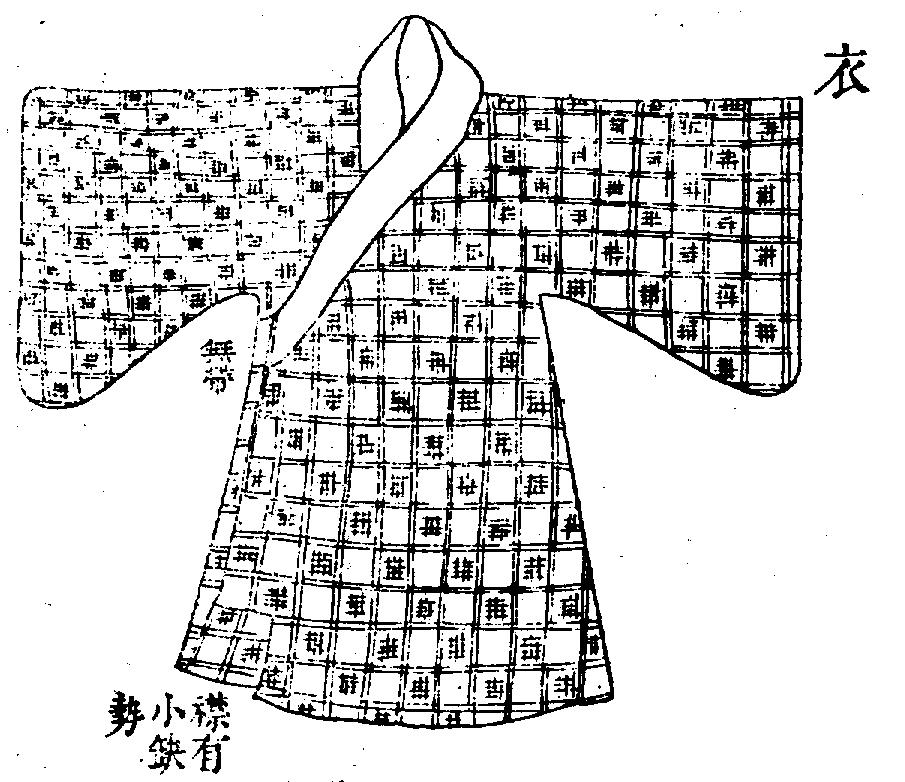
Illustration of Ryukyu upper clothing called Jin (衣) by the people of Ryukyu, 1721, from the Zhongshan chuanxinlu《中山傳信錄》; Men and women wore similar form of jin.

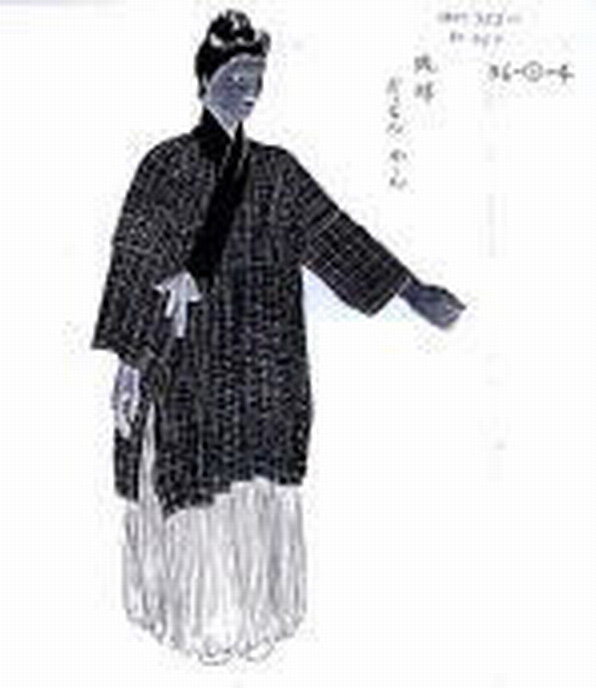
Ryukyu woman wearing Chinese-style dujin (胴衣; ドゥジン) upper garment and skirt (called kakan)

=== America and Europe ===
British Chinoiserie fashion had incorporated key elements from the construction design of Chinese clothing, including the use of wide sleeves and side closure; these designs were then adapted to meet the aesthetic tastes of Europeans. The design of wrap-style closure or neckline, known as jiaoling (交領; 'intersecting collar') in China, in European garments was the results of the heavy influences of Orientalism which was popular in the 19th century. (Note: Such as British tea gowns of the 19th century)

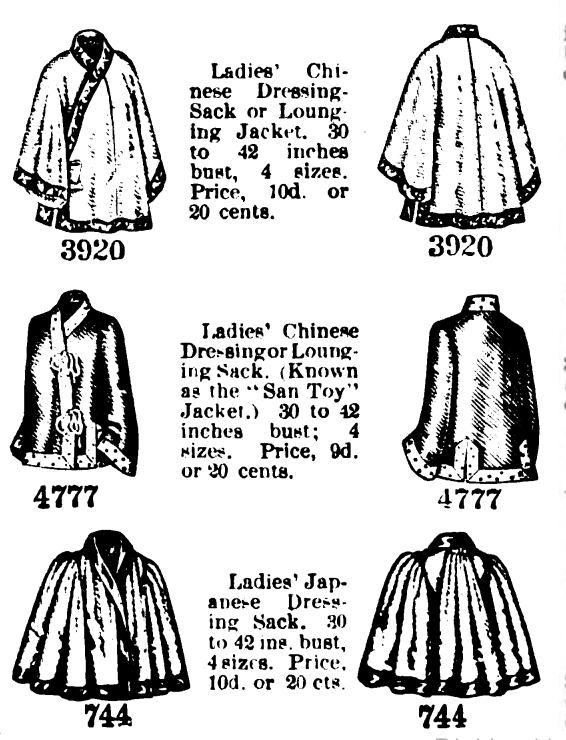
Two Chinese inspired wrap top (#3920 and #4777) and a Japanese inspired wrap-top (#744), early 1900s, images from The Delineator Volume 58, dated 1901.

Chinese also influenced various designs and styles of déshabillé in the United States. Chinese jackets with wrap closure also influenced American fashion in the early 1900s; an example of such jacket is the San toy (#4777), which appeared in American women's magazine, The Delineator, in 1901. In volume 57, The Delineator described it as being "Ladies' Chinese dressing", and as having "a strong suggestion of the Orient". The San toy was designed to be loose-fitting, a wrap closure on the left side (known as jiaoling zuoren in China) which closes with satin ribbon ties; it also featured deep side vents, which was considered as being a "novel effect", and was trimmed with a single band creating a fancy outline. The San toy of Volume 57 (#4777) reappeared in Volume 58 of The Delineator along with another Chinese-style inspired wrap top (#3920), one of which closed on the right side (known as jiaoling youren in China) with a single ribbon. The Ladies' Chinese dressing sac #3920 appeared at least a year earlier and was published in Volume 56 of The Delineator of 1900. Likewise, Japanese Kimono-style with wrap closure, also influenced American summer fashion in the early 1900s; these became known as Misses' or girls' Japanese wrapper or lounging-robe.

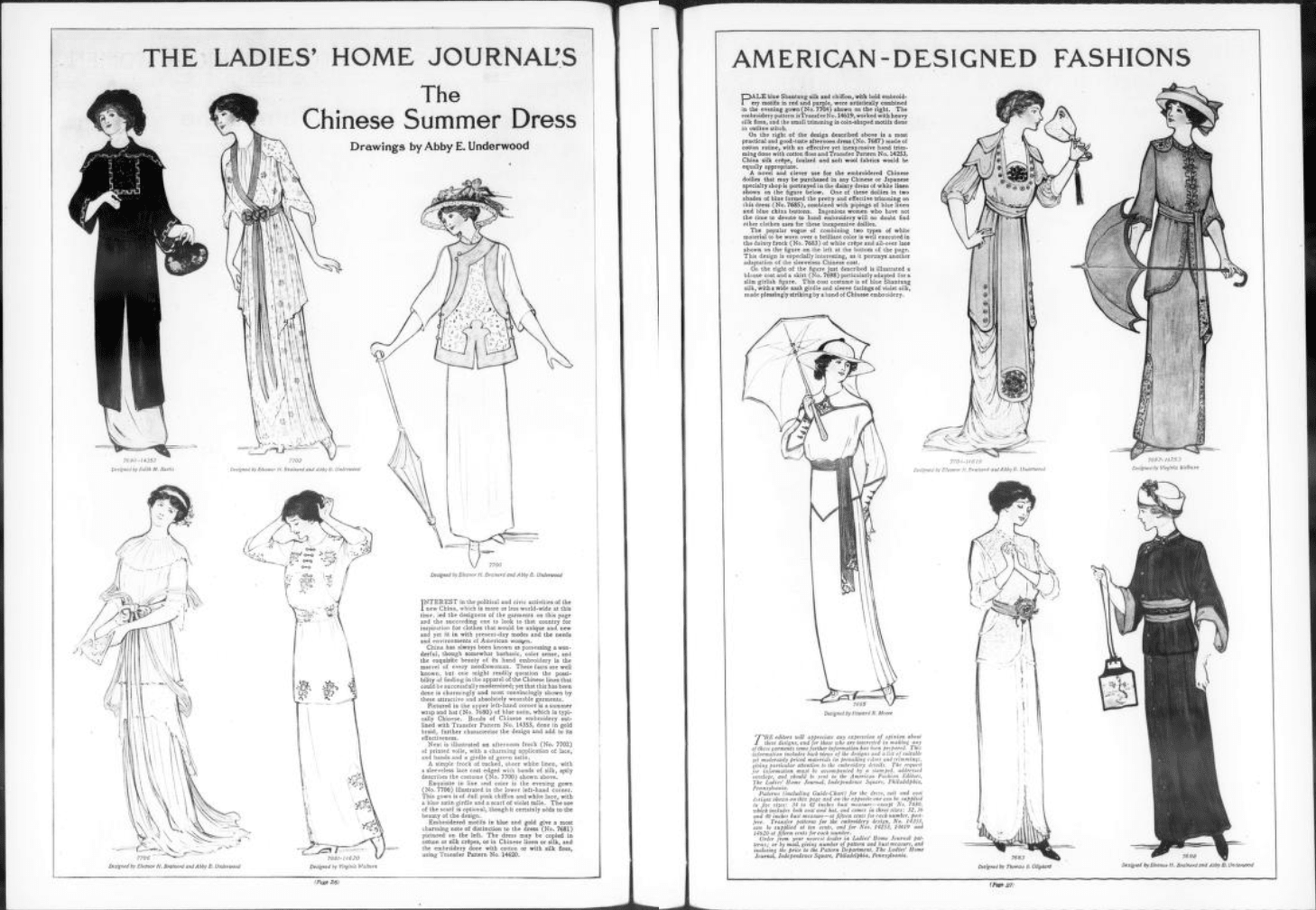
Chinese-style garments, including Chinese tops, designed by US designers in 1910s, published from the Chinese Summer dress from Ladies’ Home Journal of June 1913: Vol 30 Issue 6, page 26 and 27

There are also photographic evidences of Chinese robes being used outside its wearer's home as fashion items with little or no adaption from the 1920s. The loosening of women's fashion found in the 1920s loose-fitting fashion, especially the disappearance of nipped-in corset, appears to have also been influenced by the loose lines and roomy armholes of the traditional Chinese robes and jackets along with other factors, such as the experience of freedoms of elite women at that time, the sportswear-designs of Chanel, and the garment designs by Paul Poiret who designed Middle-Eastern inspired garments.

== Usage ==
- Shanku
- Ruqun

== See also ==
- Banbi
- Bijia
- Beizi
- Paofu
- Hanfu
- List of Hanfu
- Garment collars in Hanfu
- Hufu
