= Chang'ao =

Type of long Chinese jacket

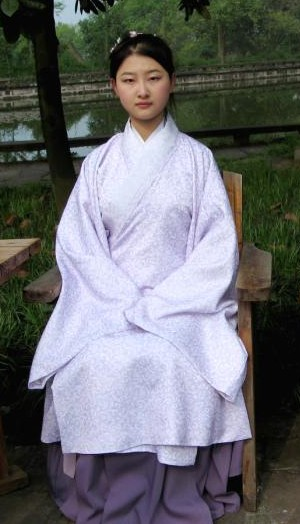
- Woman wearing a chang'ao.
- Traditional Chinese: 長襖
- Simplified Chinese: 长袄
- Literal meaning: Long jacket
Transcriptions
Standard Mandarin
- Hanyu Pinyin: Cháng ǎo

Chang-ao (simplified Chinese: 长袄; traditional Chinese: 長襖; trans. "long jacket" or "long ao", is a historical long-length, Chinese upper garment called ao (袄), which was worn by women. It is also known as da ao (大袄) and chang ru (长襦; "long ru jacket") which appears to be the precursor of the ao.

When paired with a skirt, the chang-ao forms a style of aoqun (i.e. jacket worn over a skirt). This set of attire is worn as a formal attire.

== History ==
In the Ming dynasty, the wearing of long-length upper jacket (ao) with skirts became more prevalent than the wearing of short upper jacket with skirts. Several paintings, book illustrations, tomb artefacts, and references from books which dates from the late Ming dynasty show that women were wearing long-length ao with a skirt during this period.

The combination of long-length ao with skirt continued to exist in the Qing dynasty. However the style of Ming dynasty ao continued to evolve under the influence of the Manchu fashion. By the late Qing dynasty, it was typical for the ao to be waist-length. The late Qing ao also had different types of opening (i.e. central front opening, slant opening), could have either narrow or wide sleeves and could have a mandarin collar.

After the fall of the Qing dynasty, the ao continued to be worn in the Republic of China; the 1910s ao style was once again lengthen up to hip level, and sometimes up to the knees. It was once again shortened in the 1920s to be waist-length.

== Construction and design ==
The chang-ao was actually developed from zhiduo during the Ming Dynasty, and is worn over a skirt. It is wide-sleeved, shorter than zhiduo and has no side panels (暗擺) at the side slits (thus showing the skirt worn underneath). There is often an optional detachable protective huling (護領; 'protect collar') sewn to the collar. The huling can be of white or any other dark colours. The collar is of the same colour as the clothing.

== Gallery ==
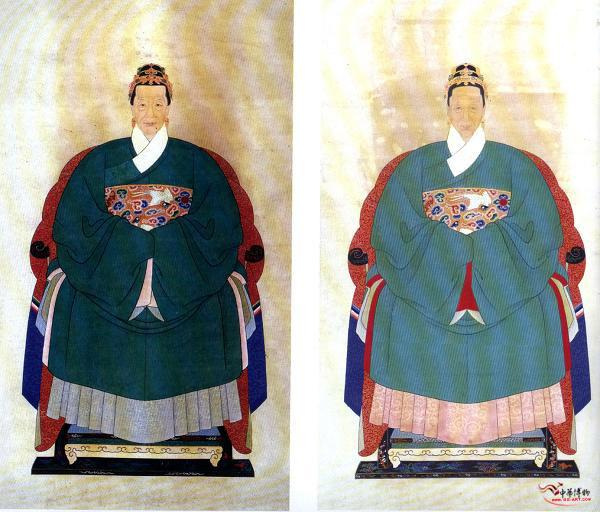
Portrait of noblewomen wearing Chang-ao with mandarin square

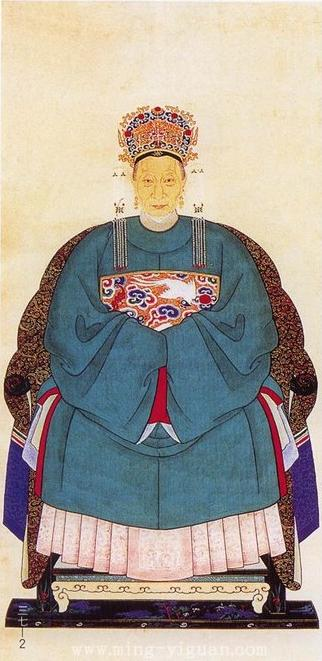
Portrait of noblewomen wearing round-collared Chang-ao with mandarin square

== Related clothing ==
- Ruqun
- Qungua

== See also ==
- Hanfu
- List of Hanfu
- Ru - Chinese upper garment
