= Daxiushan =

Traditional Chinese large gown

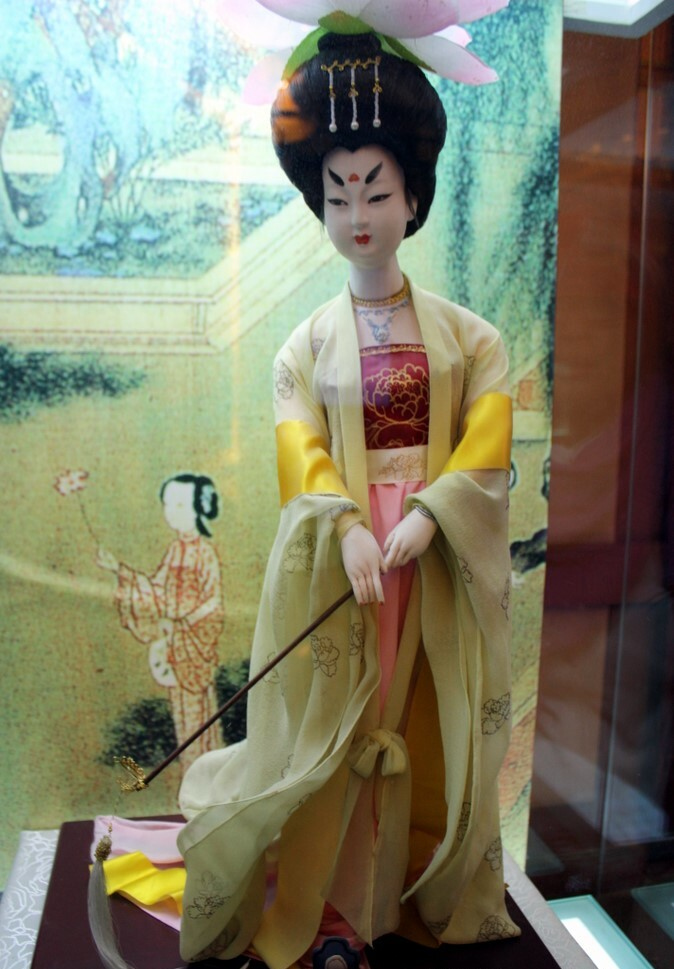
- The clothing that the figure wears, depicts Tang dynasty Daxiushan (大袖衫), taken in Xi'an Shaanxi History Museum.
- Chinese: 大袖衫
- Literal meaning: "large sleeved robe" or "large sleeved gown" or "large sleeved shirt" or "broad sleeved robe" or "broad sleeved garment"
Transcriptions

Daxiushan (Chinese: 大袖衫; lit. 'large-sleeved gown'), also referred as dianchailiyi (Chinese: 钿钗礼衣), dashan (Chinese: 大衫; lit. 'Large shirt'), daxiu (Chinese: 大袖; lit. 'Big sleeves'), is a form of shan, a traditional Chinese upper garment, with broad sleeves in Hanfu. It was most popular during the Tang dynasty, particularly among the members of royalty. The daxiushan was mainly worn for special ceremonial occasions and had different variations, mainly the result of different collar formations (e.g., parallel or cross collar or those with no collar). The daxiushan could be worn under a skirt or as an outerwear. After the Tang dynasty, it continued to be worn in the Song and Ming dynasties.

== Terminology ==
It has come to be known as daxiushan but has also been called dianchailiyi at various times. It was also referred as dashan and daxiu in the Ming dynasty.

== History ==
=== Tang dynasty and Five dynasties and Ten Kingdoms ===
After the golden age of the Tang dynasty ended, the influence of Hufu, the clothing styles from Central and Western Asia, gradually weakened and the clothing styles of the royal women of the Tang dynasty began to make their transformation becoming more and more broader and looser.

It was not until the mid-late Tang dynasty period (中晚唐时期) that the distinctions between royal women's clothing and other styles became increasingly obvious. The width of sleeves worn by common women often exceeded 4 feet in the mid-late Tang dynasty. Some of daxiushan of this period was depicted in paintings as being made of transparent gauze, such as depicted in the painting Beauties with Flowery hairpins.

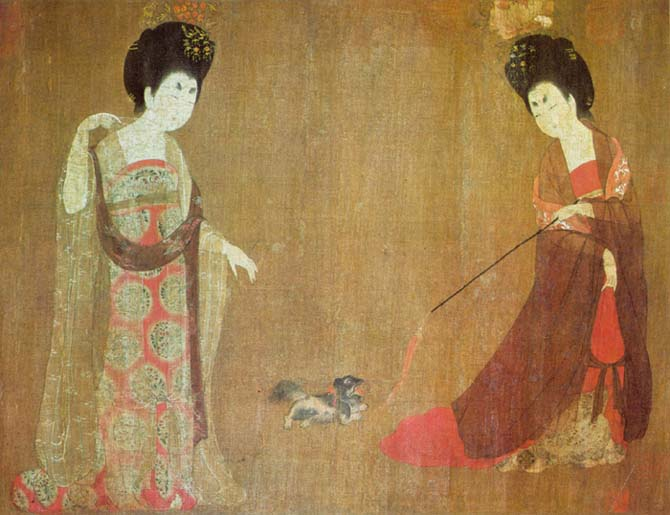
Paintings of women wearing Daxiushan during the Tang dynasty

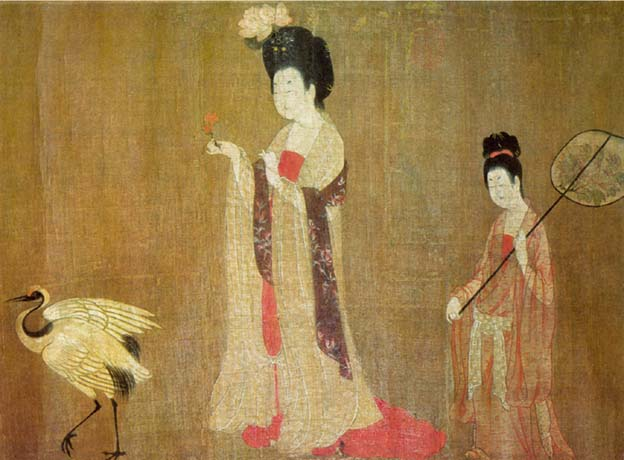
Paintings of women wearing Daxiushan during the Tang dynasty

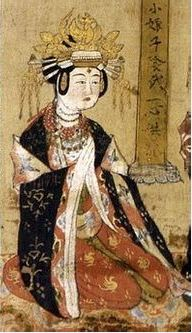
A late Tang dynasty Buddhist donatress.

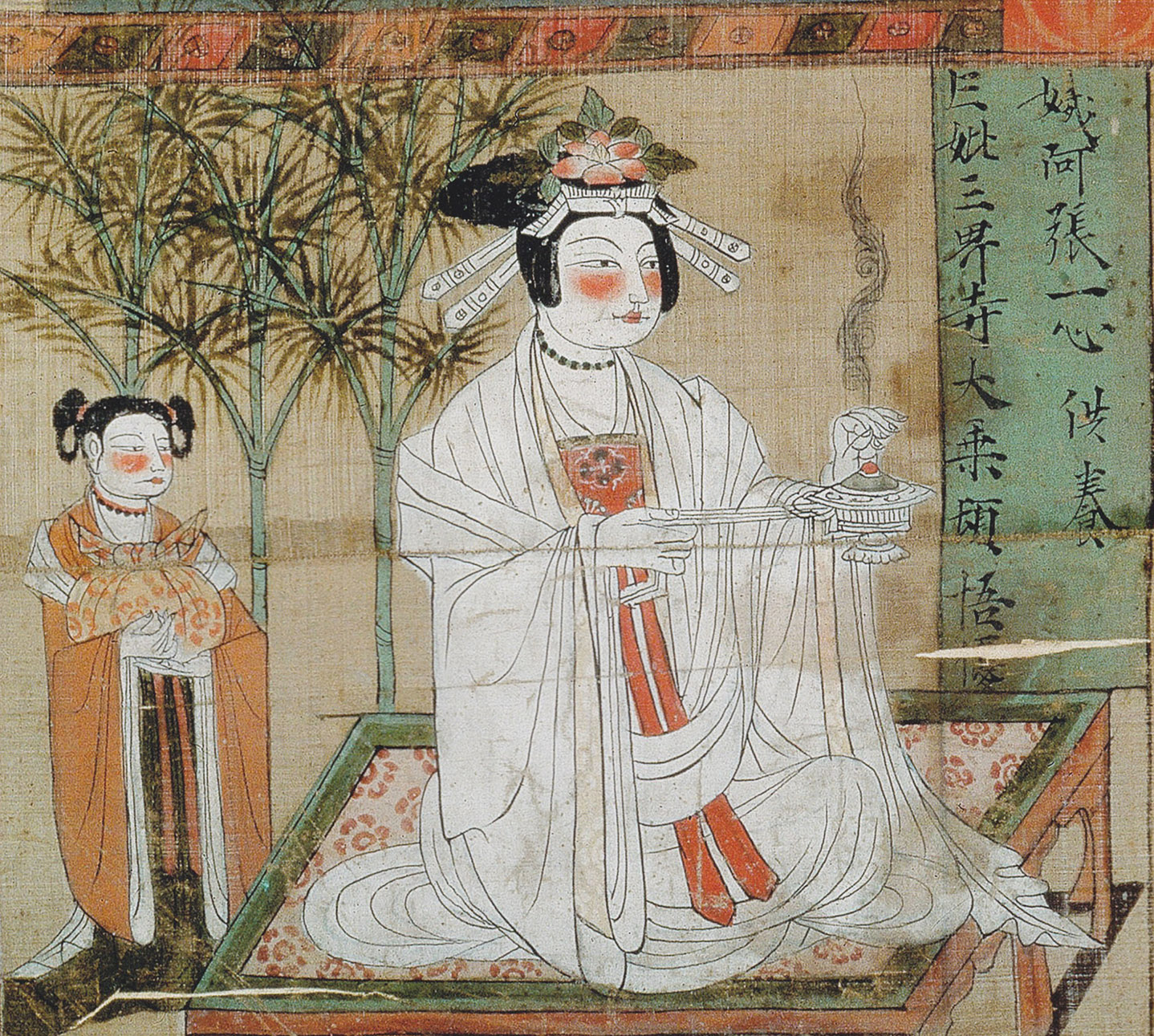
Buddhist donatress Chang, Mo-kao Caves, Five dynasties and Ten Kingdoms.

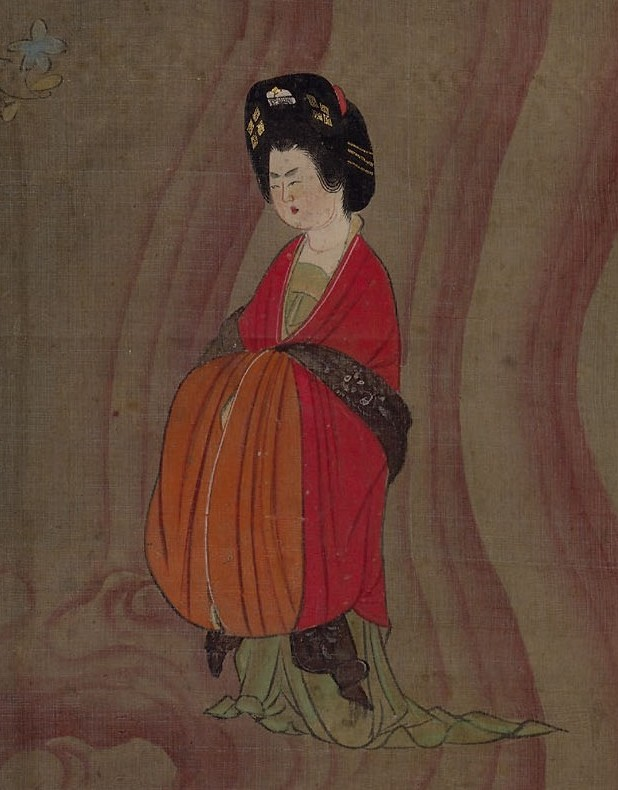
Red daxiushan, Late Tang or Five dynasties and Ten Kingdoms period

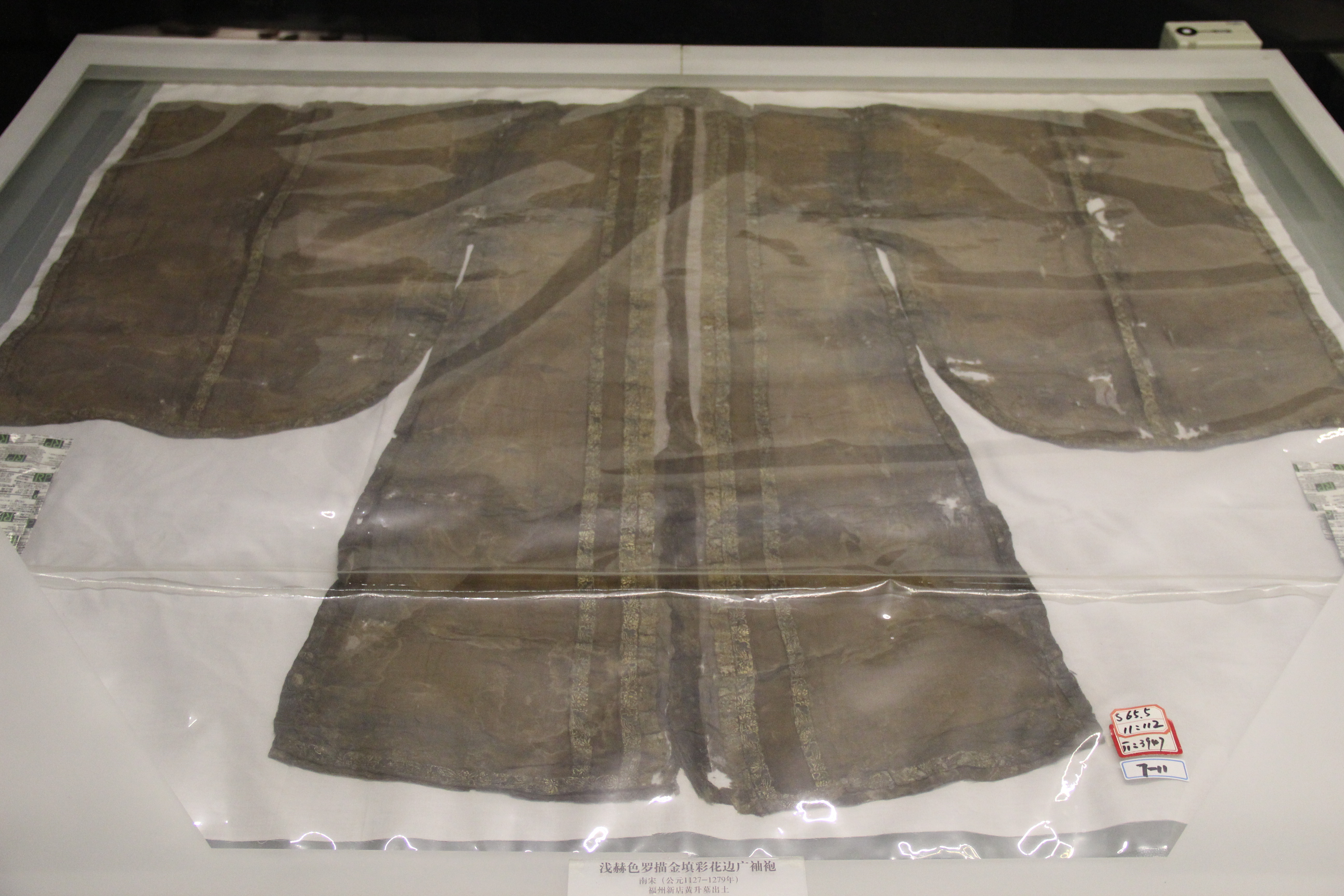
Unearthed artifact of a daxiushan dating to the Southern Song dynasty.

=== Song dynasty ===
The daxiushan was originally worn by empresses and imperials concubines as their ordinary clothing. However, it was later adopted by the aristocratic women who used it as part of their ceremonial attire. Commoners were not allowed to wear the daxiushan and had to wear the beizi instead.

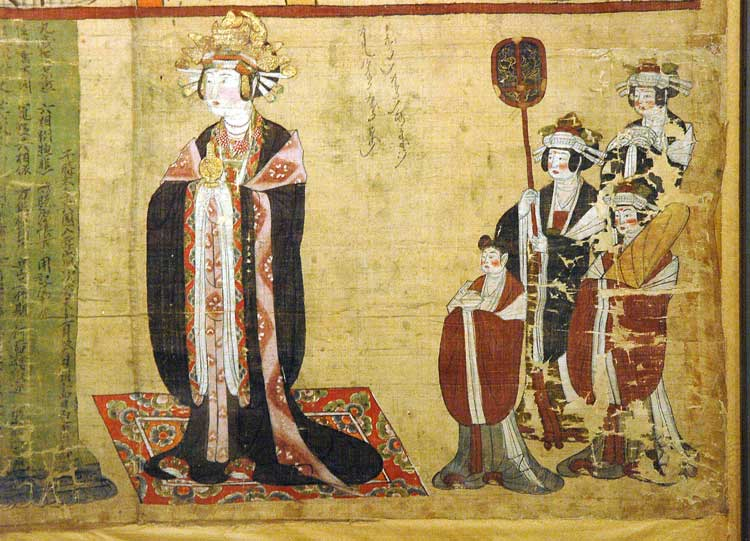
Buddhist donors, Guiyi era, 983 AD

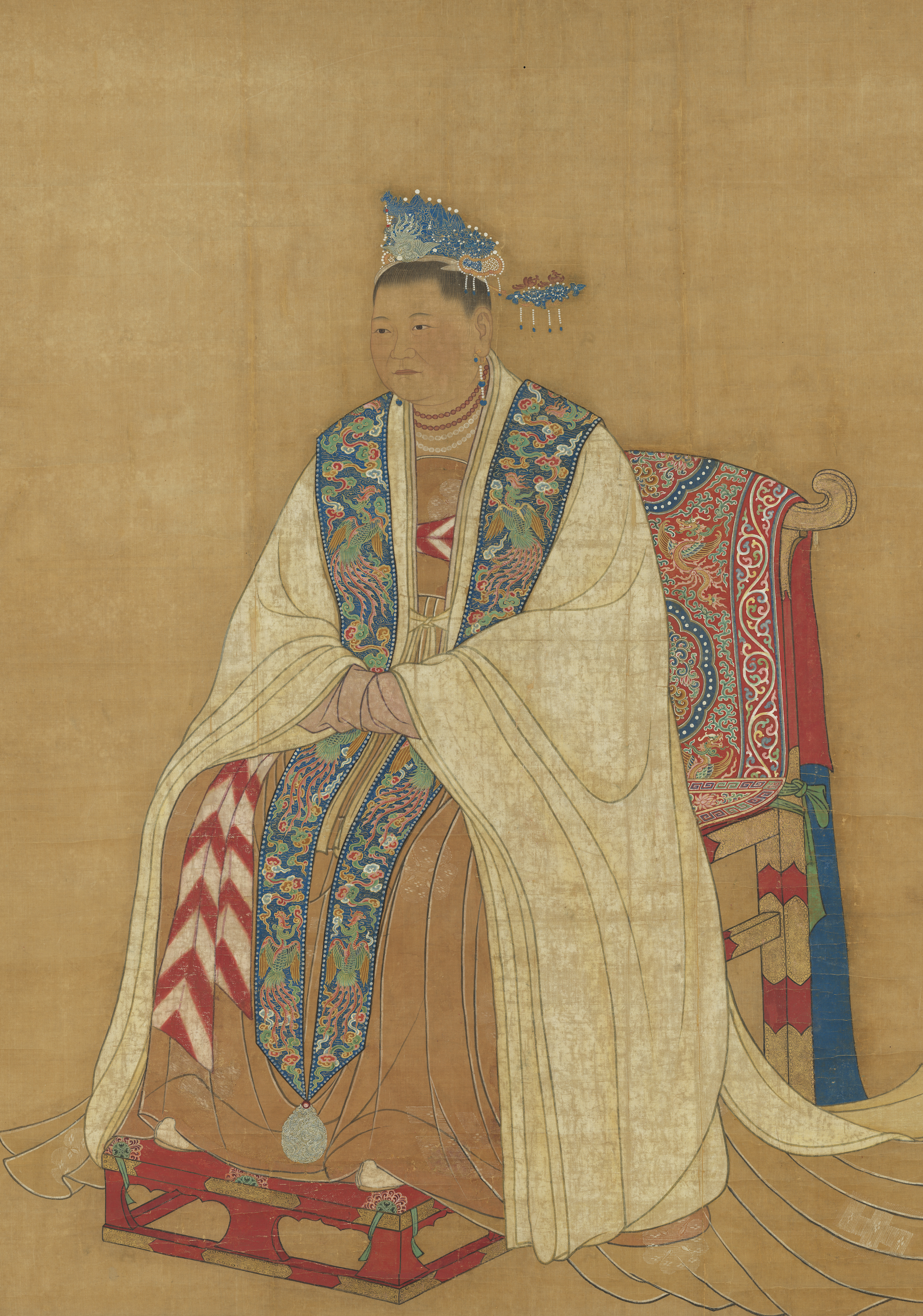
Yellow dashan and xiapei worn by Empress Du.

=== Ming dynasty ===
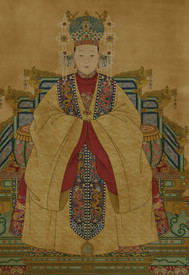
Empress Xiaoduan wearing a yellow dashan with a xiapei over her shoulders, Ming dynasty.

In the Ming dynasty, the daxiushan was known as dashan (大衫). A yellow coloured dashan was worn by the Ming dynasty huanghou (皇后; 'empress'), while a red dashan was worn by the women of the imperial clan, which could include the huangfei (皇妃), huangtaizifei (皇太子妃), qingwangfei (亲王妃), junwangfei (郡王妃). The red dashan was also worn by the Mingfu, titled court women of first rank. The Ming dynasty also bestowed dashan to the queens of Joseon, where it became known as daesam (Korean: 대삼; Hanja: 大衫; RR: daesam).

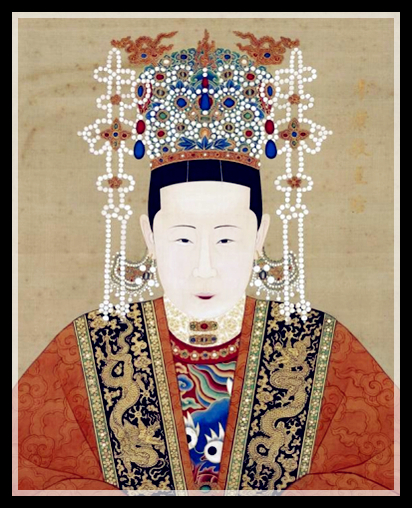

== Construction and Design ==
=== Tang dynasty daxiushan ===
The width of the coat increased to more than four feet and its sleeves were often wider than 1.3 metres. It features a distinctive gown that covers the body from the ground to just above the chest with a knot wrapped around the waist, a light and sometimes sheer outer coat that ties together at the bottom, near the knees, and often goes along with a long pibo draped around the arms. The clothing often only covers half of women's breast and so it is restricted to women of a certain status, such as princesses or gējī.

== Derivative and influences ==
=== Korea ===
During the Joseon period, the daesam (Korean: 대삼; Hanja: 大衫; RR: daesam) was a red, non-decorated robe with wide sleeves worn by the queens in early Joseon from the reign of King Munjong to the reign of King Seonjo for important state ceremonies; the daesam was among the clothing items and accessories (including dansam, overcoats, skirts, jeogwan, hair accessories with floral decorations, hapi, a jade scepter) bestowed by the Ming dynasty during the reign of King Munjong until 1603 under the reign of King Seonjo. According to Hong Nayong, the daesam is believed to be in the form of the Ming dynasty's daxiushan, which was worn by the titled court women of first rank. The Ming dynasty bestowed official clothing to the Joseon's queens but not the wife of the Crown prince, as such the clothing sent by the Ming dynasty to the Joseon queens in early Joseon became the prototypes for the robes of crown princess of Joseon. After the fall of the Ming dynasty, daesam continued to be worn in Joseon by the queens and crown princesses for special occasions, such as the weddings, and ceremonial occasions. Since the reign of King Yeonjo, the jeogui became the Joseon's queen royal ceremonial clothing instead and the daesam appears to have ceased being worn. However, the basic style of jeogui worn during the latter Joseon period during wedding appears to have been influenced by the daesam of the early Joseon period.

== Similar garments ==
- Beizi

== See also ==
- Hanfu
- List of Hanfu
- Banbi
- Bijia
