= Garment collars in hanfu =

Shape of collars used in hanfu

Garment collars in hanfu are diverse and come in several shapes, including jiaoling (cross-collars, overlapping collars at the front which closed on the right or left sides), duijin, yuanling, liling, fangling, tanling. Some forms of collars were indigenous to China while others had been adopted from the Hufu of other non-Han Chinese ethnic minorities and/or from the clothing worn by foreigners.

== Cultural significance ==
=== Ru ===
==== Youren (right lapel) ====
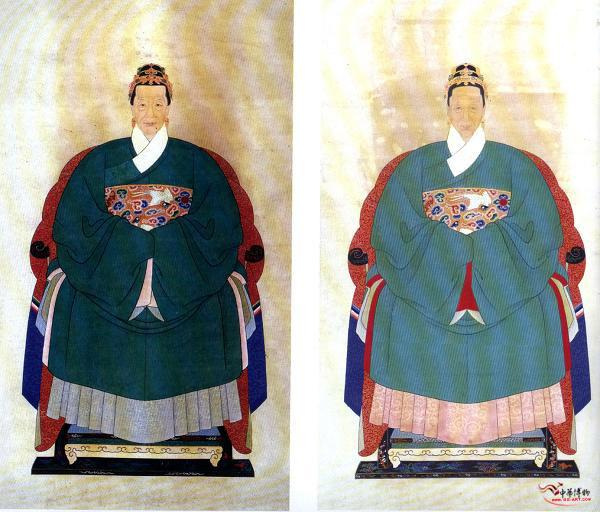
Jiaoling youren, Ming Dynasty

Chinese robes, such as the shenyi and the paofu as a general term, as well as Chinese jackets must typically cover the right part of their garment. Styles of garments which overlap at the front and close to the wearer's right side are known as youren (右衽; 'right lapel'). The youren closure is a style which originated in China and can be traced back to the Shang dynasty. The youren is also an important symbol of the Han Chinese ethnicity. The youren closure was eventually adopted by other ethnic minorities and was also spread to neighbouring countries, such as Vietnam, Korea and Japan.

==== Zuoren (left lapel) ====
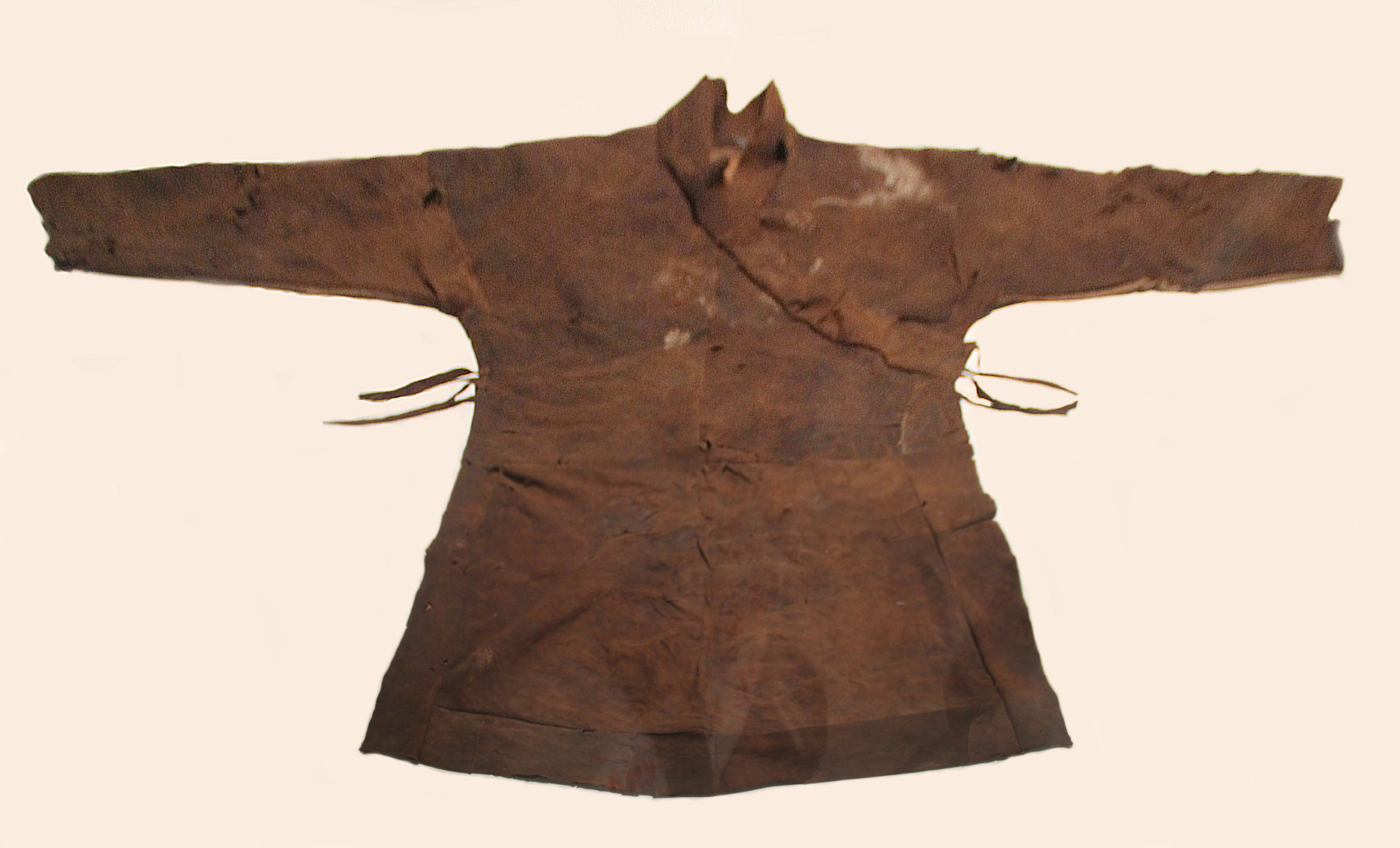
Jiaoling zuoren, Xiongnu leather robes, Han dynasty

Chinese people also wore another form of closure known as zuoren (左衽; 'left lapel'), which generally refers the way garment overlaps on the front, like the youren closure, but instead closes on the left side. According to the Shuowen Jiezi (說文解字), a form of paofu, known as xi (襲), was a robe with a zuoren closure while the coat known as zhe (褶); sometimes also referred as xi), typically used as part of the kuzhe, was also a xi (襲) according to the Shiming.

The use of zuoren, however, was typically associated with funeral practices. This can also be found in the chapter Sang da ji (喪大記) of the Liji (禮記):

小斂大斂，祭服不倒，皆左衽結絞不紐

[At both the dressings the sacrificial robes were not placed below the others. They were all placed with the lapel to lie on the left side. The bands were tied firmly, and not in a bow-knot]

According to ancient Chinese beliefs, the only moment the Han Chinese were supposed to use zuoren was when they dressed their deceased. This funeral practice was rooted in ancient Chinese beliefs; especially in the Yin and Yang theory, where it is believed that the left side is the Yang and stands for life whereas the right side is the Yin which stands for death.

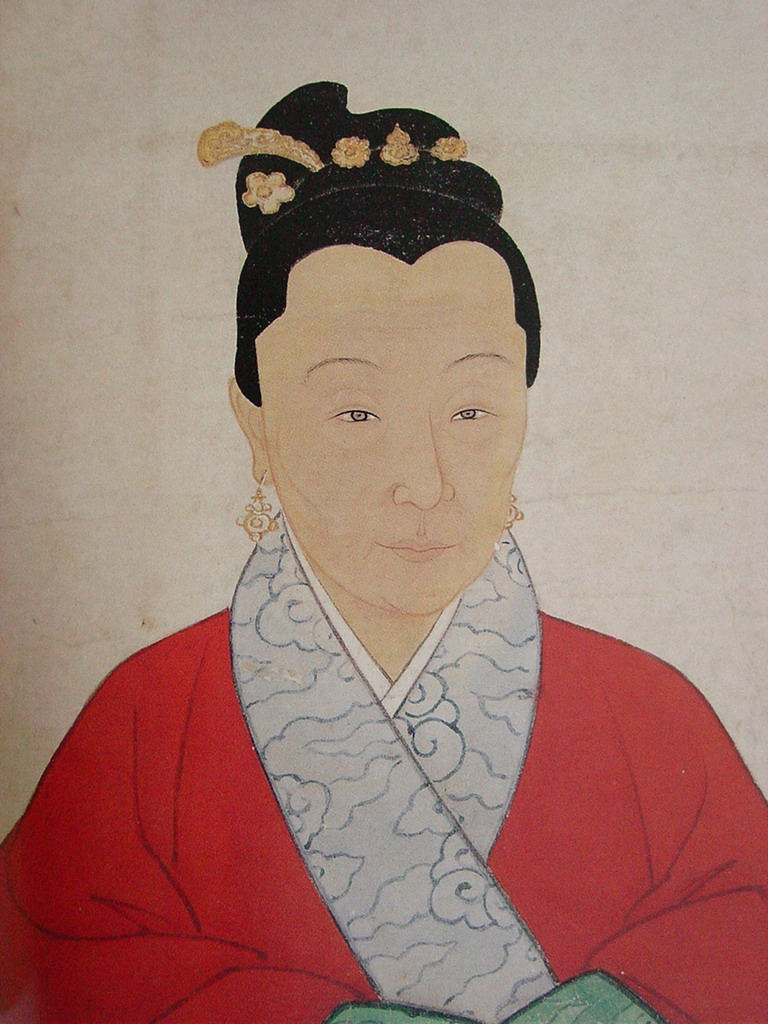
Han woman wearing Jiaoling zuoren, Ming dynasty

Therefore, according to the Yin and Yang theory, the left lapel of a garment needs to be found outside (which is in the form of youren closure) to indicate that the power of the Yang aspect is suppressing the Yin aspect, which thus symbolizes the clothing of living people. On the other hand, the zuoren is a representation of the Yin aspect surpassing the Yang aspect, and thus, garments with a zuoren closure became the clothing worn by the deceased. It was therefore a taboo in Chinese clothing culture for a living person to wear clothing with a zuoren closure.

There are exceptions in which living Han Chinese would wear clothing with a zuoren closure. For example, in some areas (such as Northern Hebei) in the 10th century, some ethnic Han Chinese could be found wearing left-lapel clothing. It was also common for the Han Chinese women to adopt left lapel under the reign of foreign nationalities, such as in the Yuan dynasty. The practice of wearing the zuoren also continued in some areas of the Ming dynasty despite being a Han Chinese-ruled dynasty which is an atypical feature.

=== Association with ethnic minorities and foreigners ===
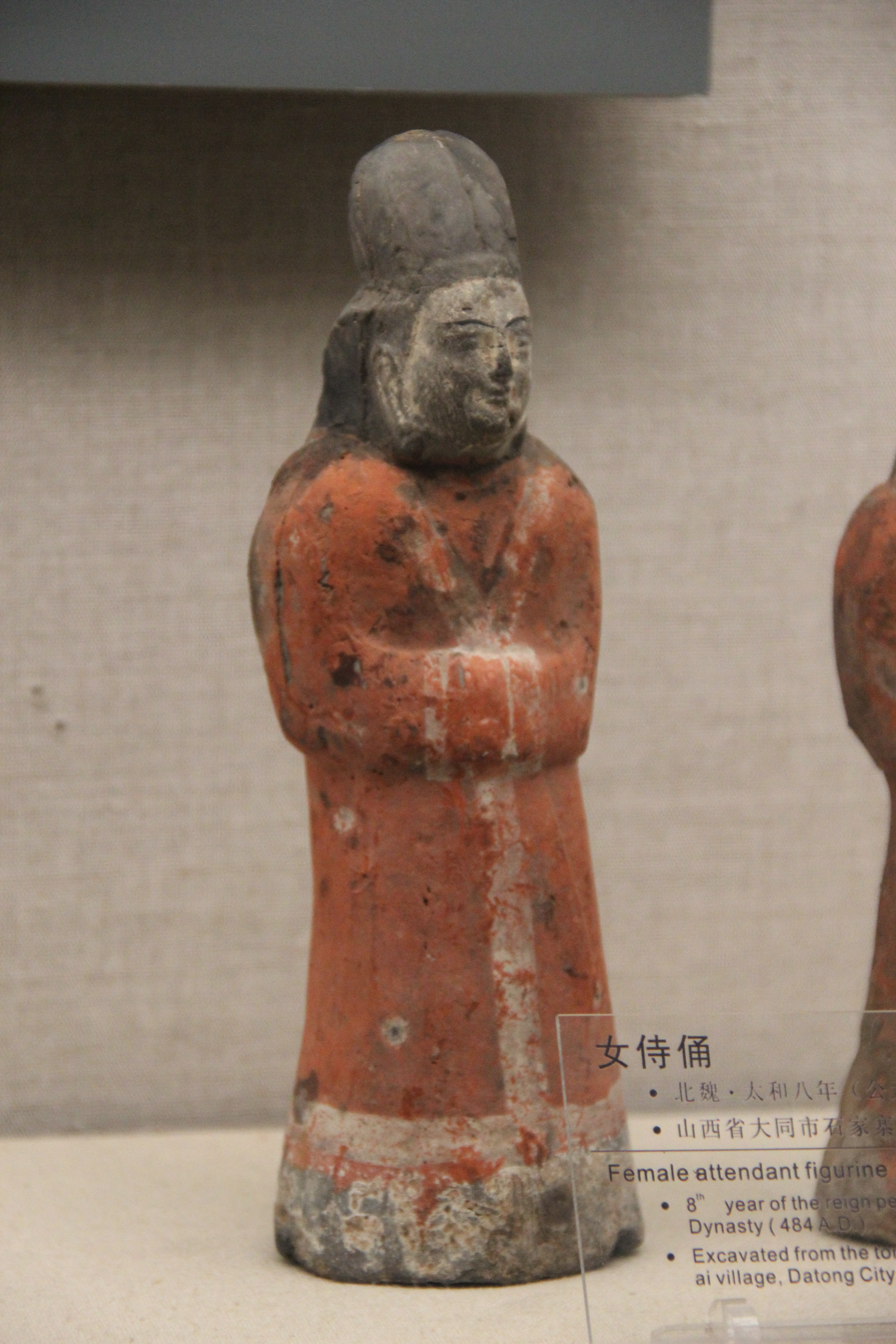
Xianbei women wearing a zuoren robe, Northern Wei

The zuoren closure was also associated with the clothing of non-Han Chinese, ethnic minorities, and foreigners in ancient times. Some ethnic minorities generally had their clothing closing in the zuoren-style according to what was recorded in ancient Chinese texts, such as the Qiang. As a result, the traditional way to distinguish between clothing of the "Barbarian" (i.e. non-Han Chinese), Hufu, and Chinese clothing, hanfu, was typically by looking at the direction of the collar.

This can also be found in the Analects where Confucius himself praised Guan Zhong for preventing the weakened Zhou dynasty from becoming barbarians:

微管仲，吾其被髮左衽矣

[But for Guan Zhong, we should now be wearing our hair unbound [pifa], and the lapels of our coats buttoning on the left side [zuoren]]

Based on Confucius' sayings, bèifà zuǒrèn (被发左衽; 被髮左衽; 'unbound hair left lapel'), bound hair and coats which closed on the left side, was associated with the clothing customs of the northern nomadic ethnic groups who were considered as barbarians. From the standpoint of the Huaxia culture, pifa was a way to reject refined culture and being turned into a barbarian.

By the Han dynasty, since Confucius himself was the first person to use the phrase pifa zuoren to refer to Non-Zhou dynasty people, this phrase became a common metaphor for primitiveness. When used by the ancient Chinese literati, the concept of pifa zuoren became a phrase, which held the symbolic of foreign people who were living a barbarous and civilized lifestyle; this concept also became a way to emphasize the customs differences between the Han people and other ethnic minorities and draw the line to distinguish who was were considered as civilized and barbarians. The zuoren thus also became a reference to Hufu and/or to the rule of foreign nationalities. Of note, some non-Chinese ethnicity who adopted Hanfu-style sometimes maintain their left lapels, such as the Khitans in the Liao dynasty.

== Common types of collar ==
=== Cross-collars ===
==== Jiaoling youren ====
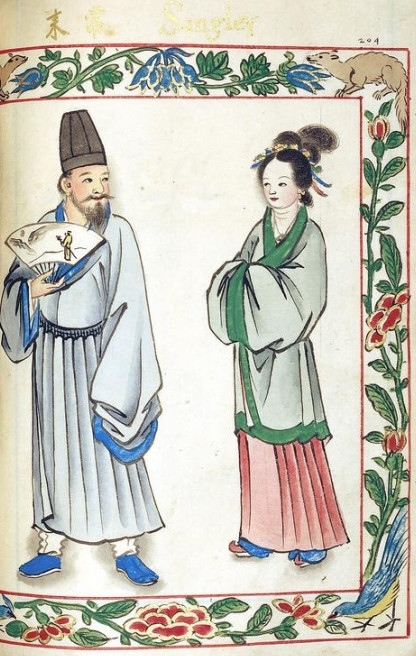
Jiaoling youren tieli (left) and jiaoling youren shan (right), Ming dynasty

Jiaoling youren (交領右衽) were cross-collars which overlapped on the front and closed on the right side following the youren (右衽) rule; they can also be described as cross-collar garments closing to the right side, or y-shaped collar. The jiaoling youren started to be worn in the Shang dynasty in China and became widespread by the Tang dynasty. This form of collar eventually became one of the major symbols of the Sino Kingdoms and eventually spread throughout Asia. Garments and attire which used the jiaoling youren collar include: shenyi, jiaolingpao, mianfu, pienfu, diyi, dahu, and tieli.

==== Jiaoling zuoren ====
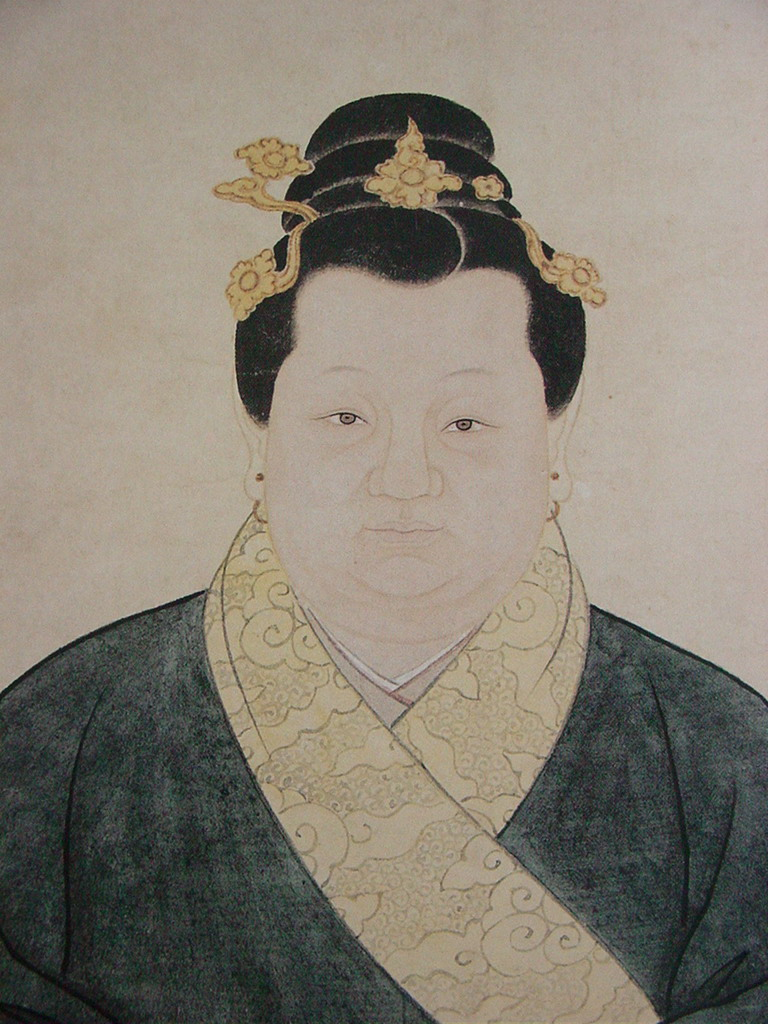
Living Han Chinese woman wearing jiaoling zuoren, Ming dynasty

Jiaoling zouren refers to the cross-collars which closes on the left side instead of the right side. They were typically used by non-Han Chinese ethnicities in ancient China, but were also adopted by the Han Chinese in some circumstances, e.g. when they were ruled by non-Han Chinese rulers. Han Chinese women were also found sometimes found in the paintings of the Ming dynasty, which is an atypical feature. They were also used to dress the deceased of the Han Chinese.

=== Central front collars ===
Collars which runs parallel and straight at the front are called duijin (对襟). Garments with duijin collars can either be closed at the centre front or be left opened in the front. They could be found with or without a high collar depending on the time period. Duijin could be used in garments and attire, such as beizi, banbi, and beixin.

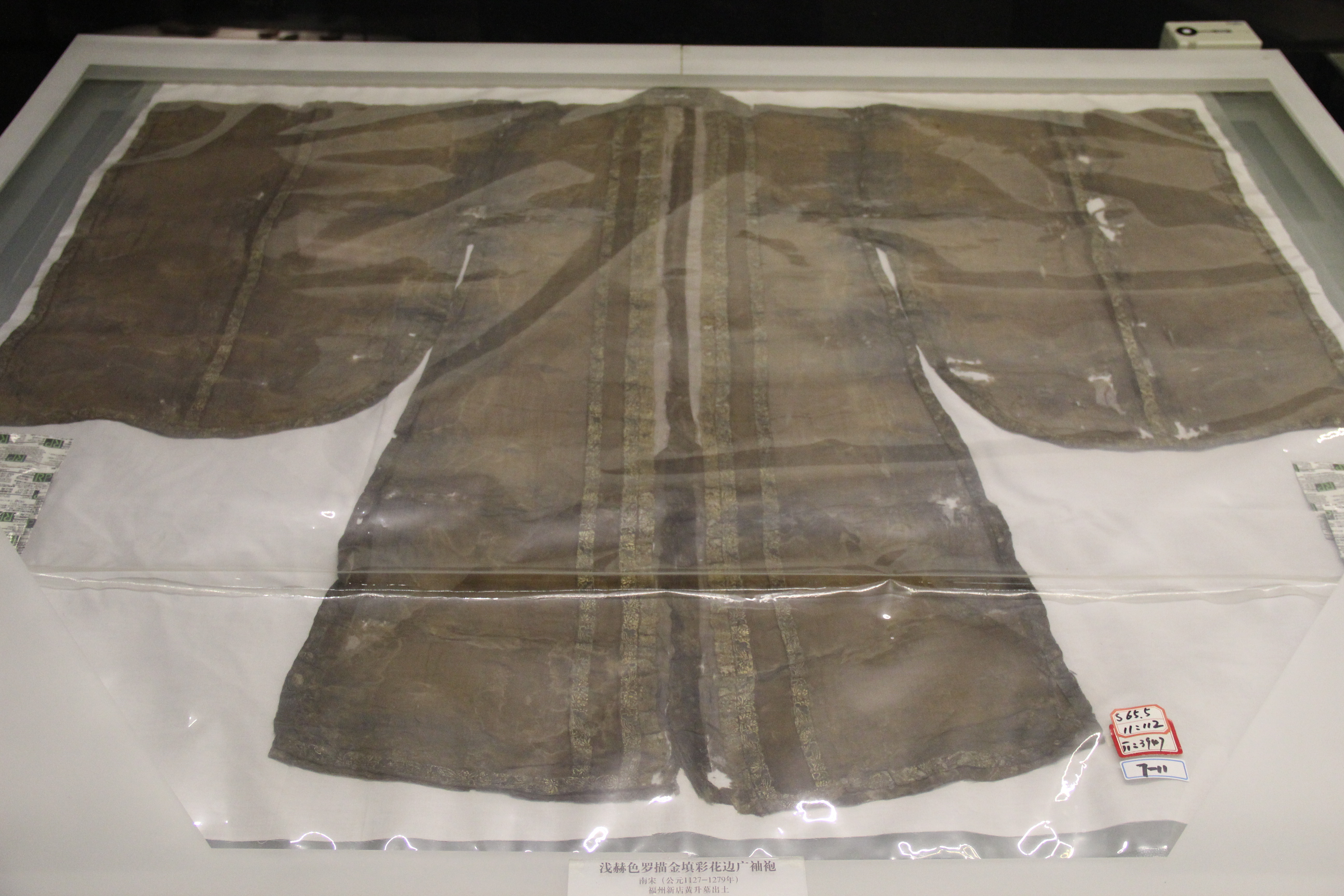
Daxiushan with duijin collar, Song dynasty

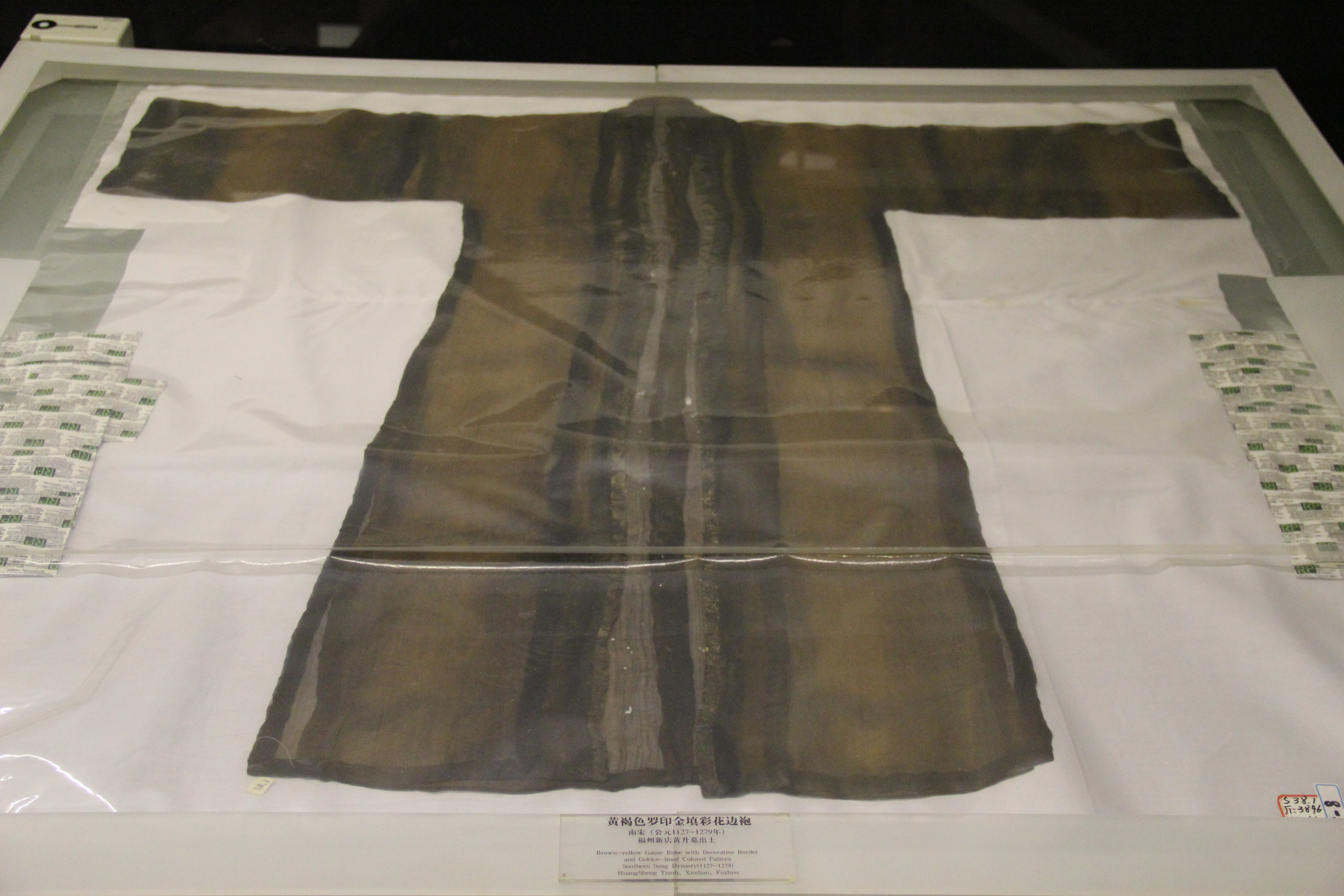
Beizi with duijin collar, Song dynasty

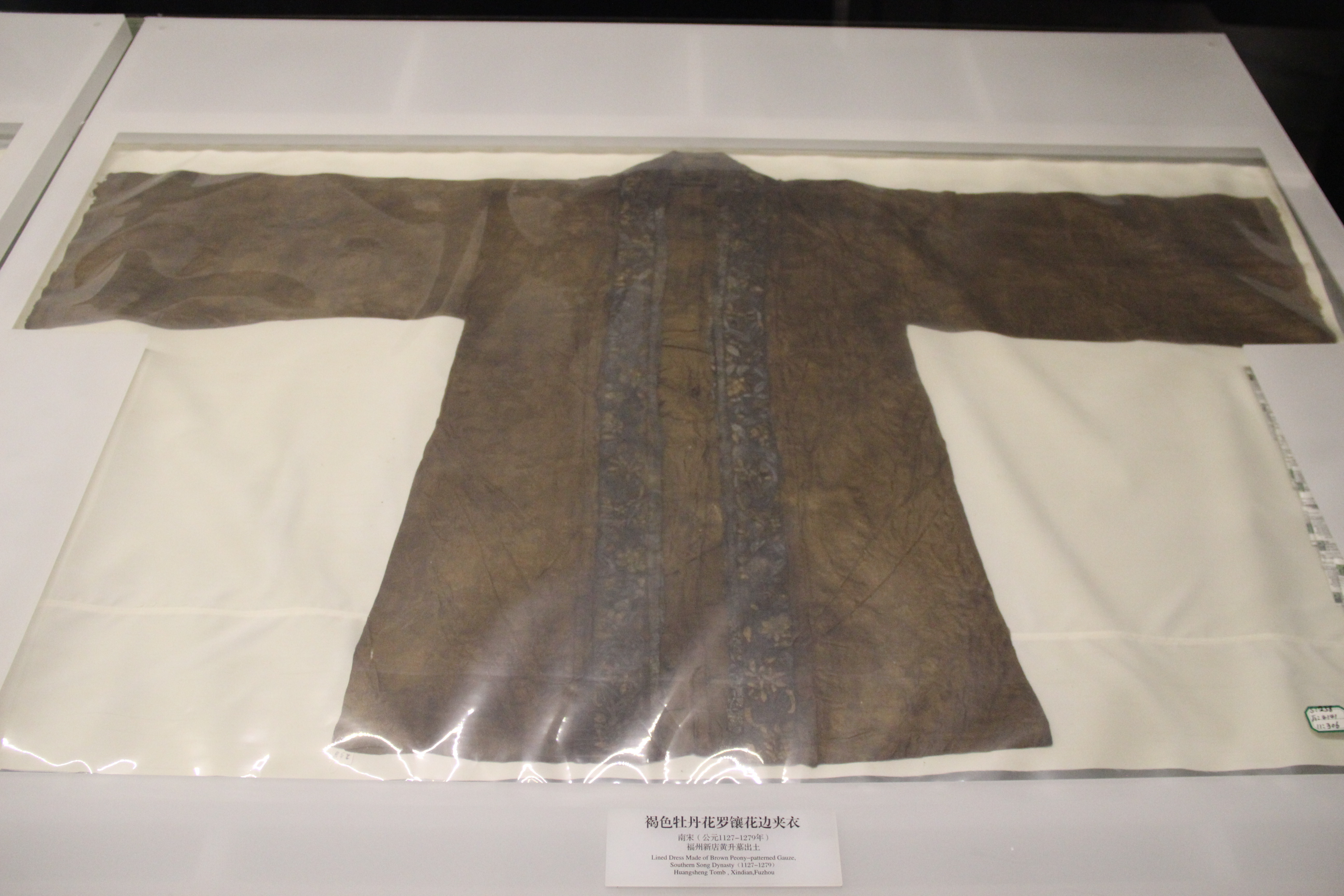
Shan with duijin collar, Song dynasty

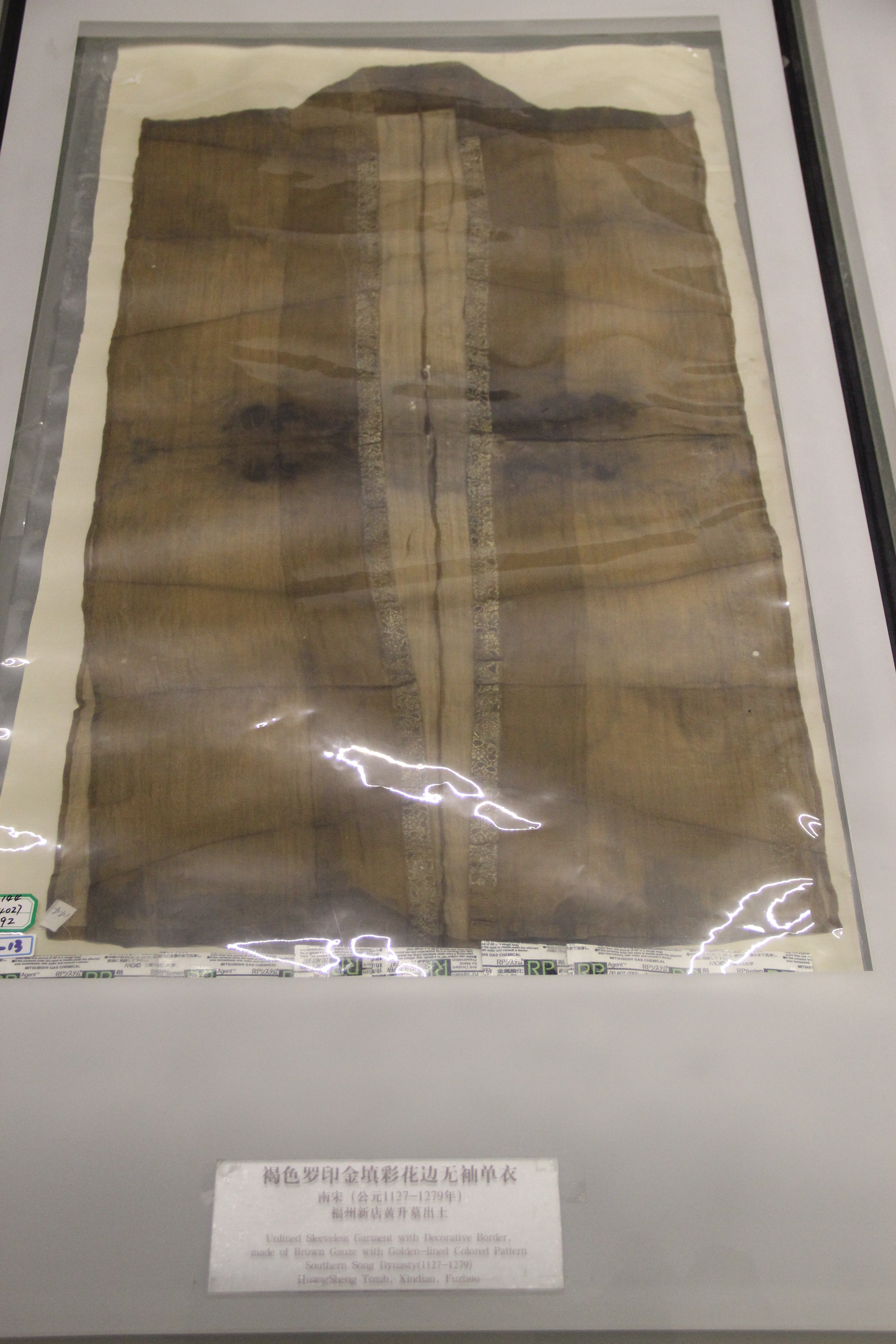
Beixin with duijin collar, Song dynasty

=== Round collars ===
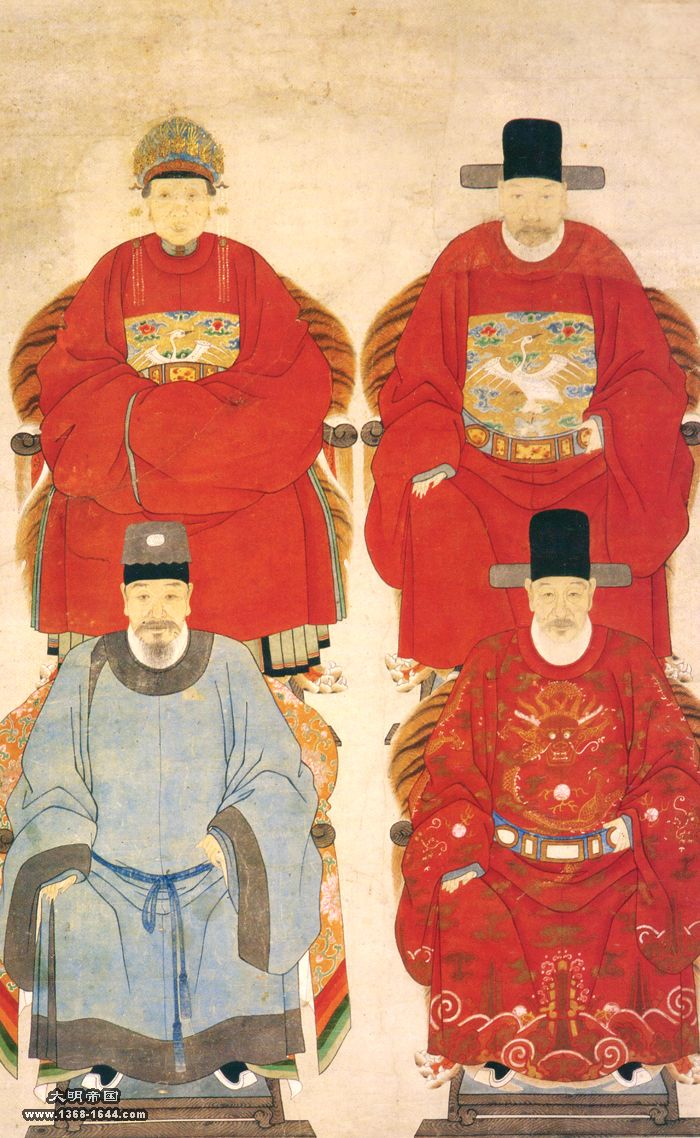
Men wearing round collars, Ming dynasty

Round collars are called yuanling (圆领) or panling (盘领). In ancient China, clothing with round collars were typically introduced and/or influenced by foreign ethnicities, such as the Donghu, the Wuhu, and the foreigners from Central Asia, such as the Sogdians, and the Mongols, at different point in time. Yuanling can be overlapping to the right or closing at the front in the duijin manner. Yuanling could be used in garments and attire, such as yuanlingshan, yuanlingpao, panling lanshan, and wulingshan (无领衫).

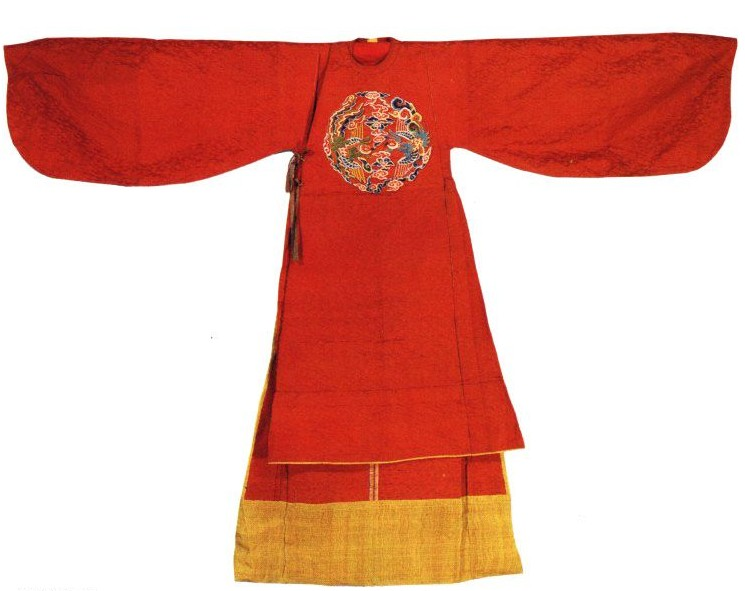
Yuanlingshan closing on the right, Ming dynasty

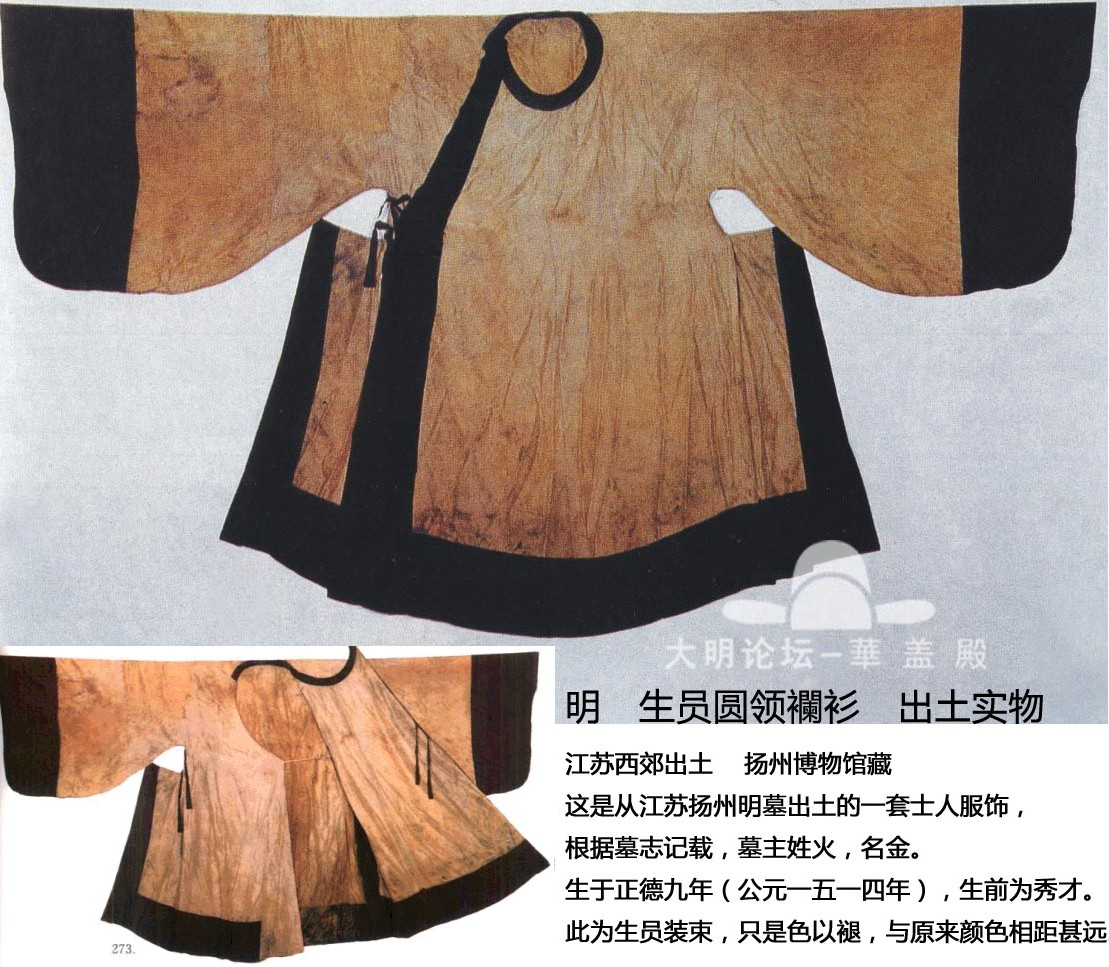
Panling lanshan, Ming dynasty

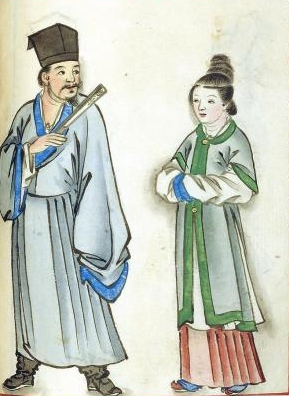
Yuanling banbi, which closes at the front in a duijin manner.

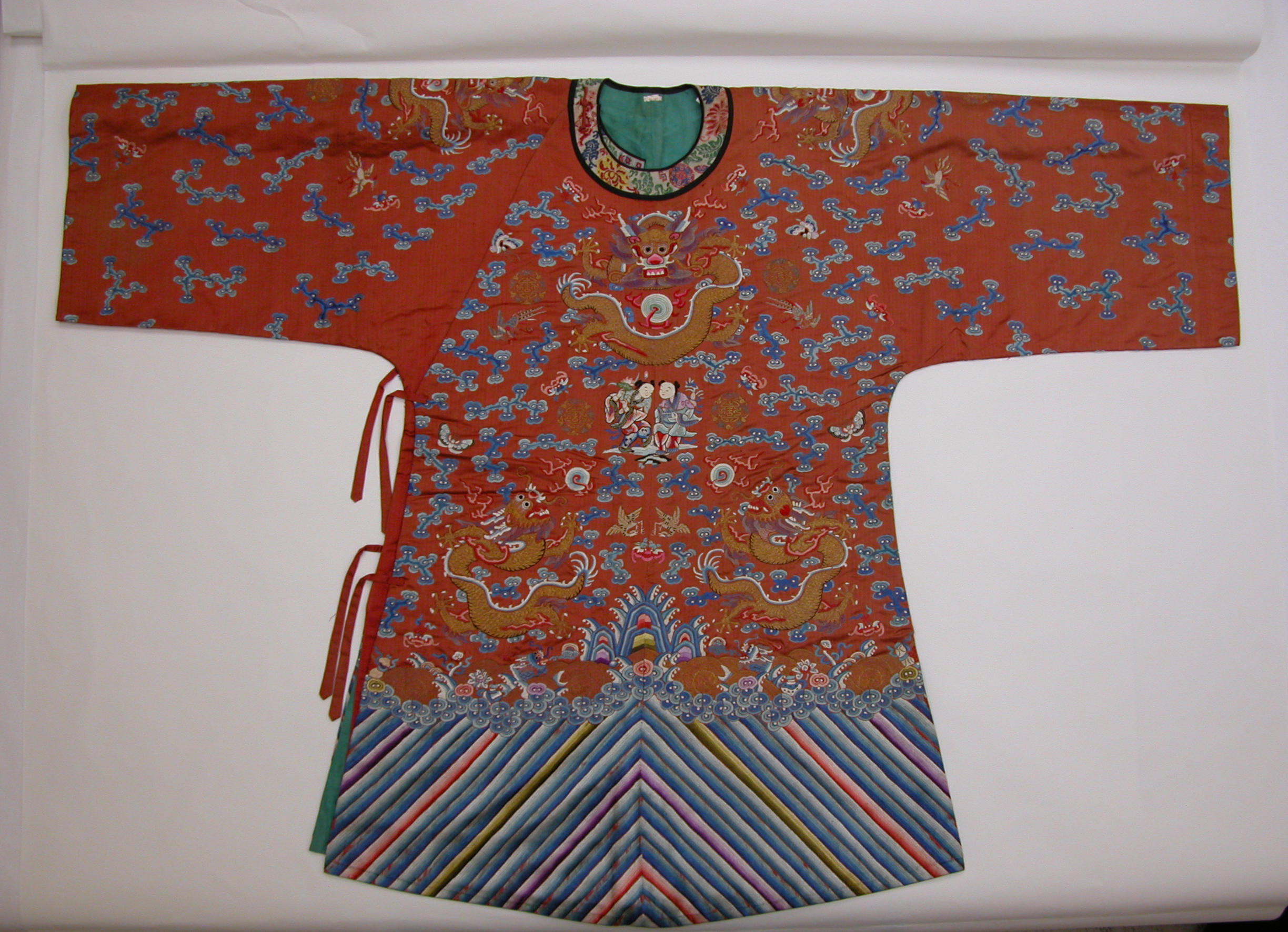
Qing dynasty

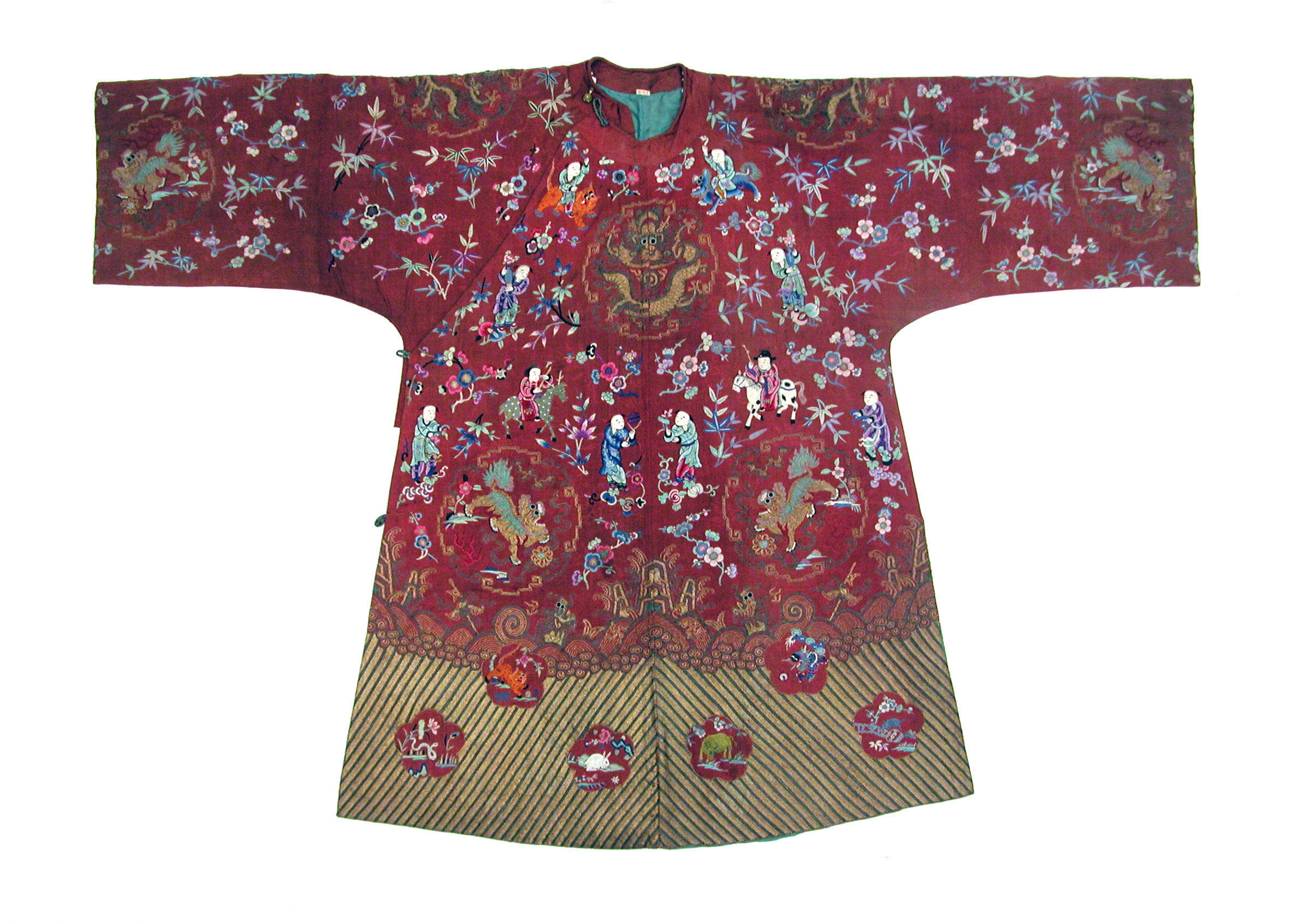
Yuanling shan, Qing dynasty.

=== Standing collars ===
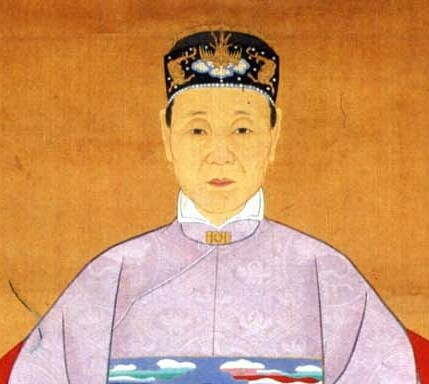
This Ming shuling dajin is a high collar that is slightly turned on itself; it has an overlapping front.

High standing collars in the Ming dynasty are referred as shuling (竖领) or liling (立领). They appeared by the late Ming dynasty. There were two main forms of high standing collars garments based on their types of lapels and closure.

==== Standing collar with right closure ====
Clothing with shuling dajin (竖领大襟), also called liling dajin or shuling xiejin or liling xiejin, has a standing collar and a large lapel which closes on the right. The dajin placket is also called xiéjīn (斜襟; 'slanted placket').

Shuling dajin

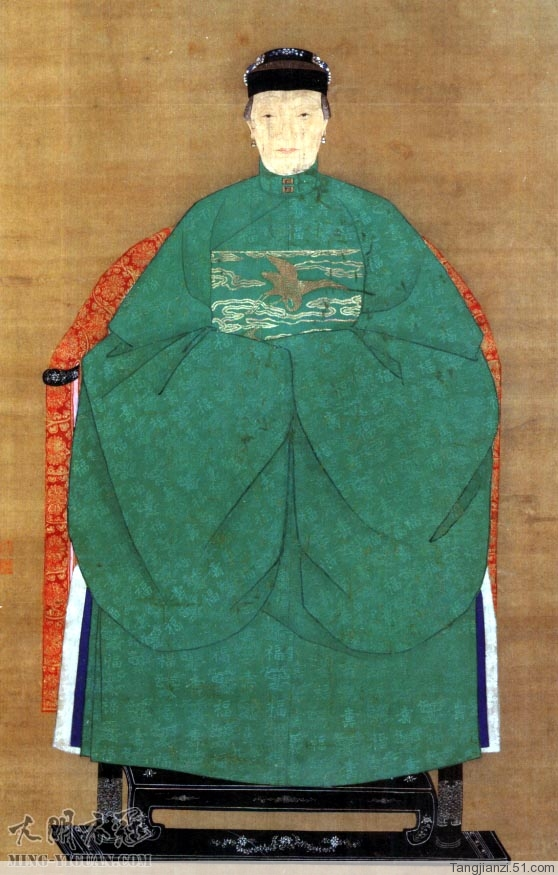
Shuling dajin, High collar with overlapping front, Ming dynasty

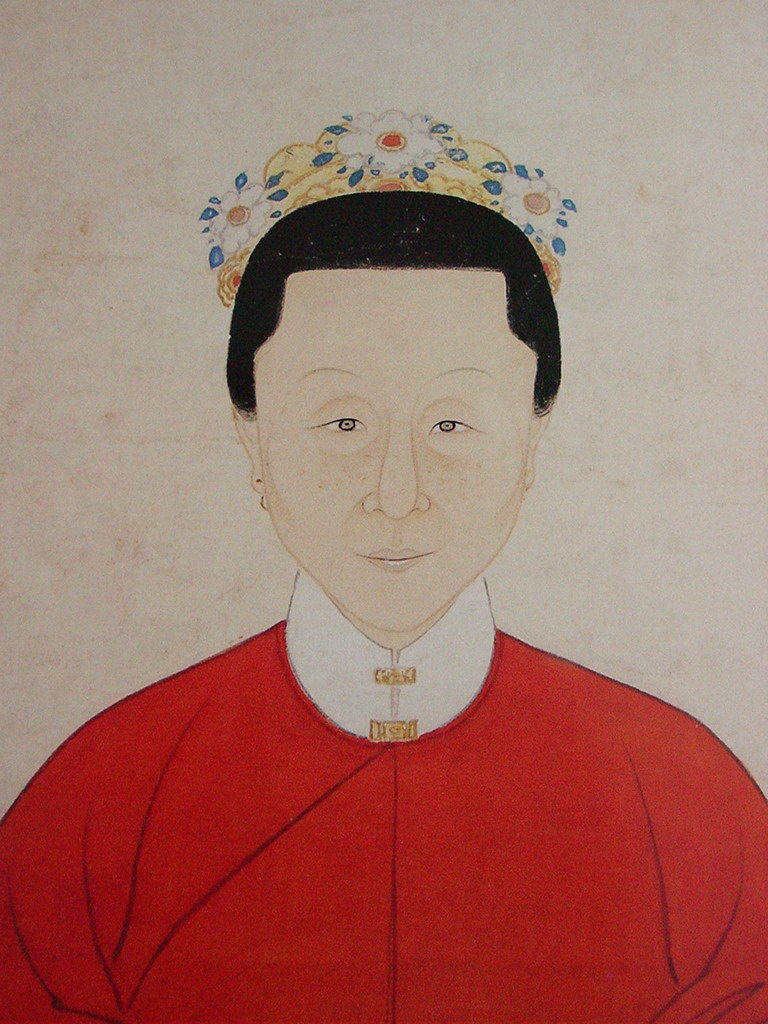
Shuling dajin, High collar with overlapping front, Ming dynasty

==== Standing collar with central front closure ====
Shuling duijin: high collar which closes at the front in a duijin manner, Ming dynasty

Clothing with shuling duijin (or liling (or shuling) duijin) has a standing collar and closes with a central front closure.

=== Lapel collars ===
Fanling refers to the lapel collars, typically categorized as Hufu-style collars

=== Square collars ===
Square collars are referred as fangling (方领).

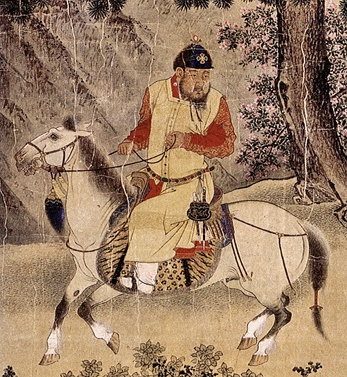
Zhaojia (罩甲) with square collar, Ming dynasty

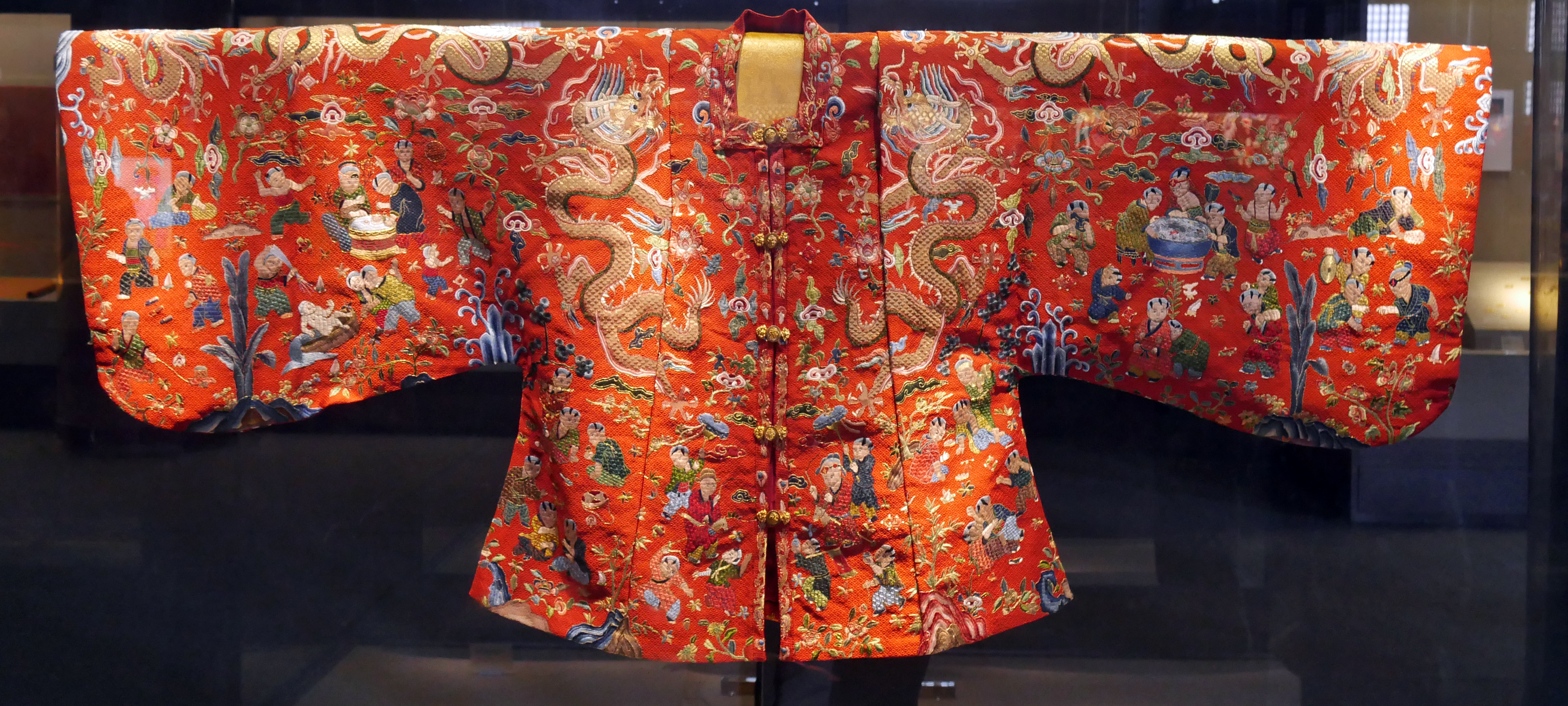
Duijin (对襟) jacket with square collar, Ming dynasty.

=== U-shaped collar ===
U-shaped collars are known as tǎnlǐng (坦领; 'flat collar/ open-hearted collar'). Tanling could be used in garments and attire, such as tanling banbi and tanling ruqun.

=== Pipa-shaped collar ===
piānjīn (偏襟; 'slanted placket'), also called Pipa-shaped collars and sometimes referred as 'slanted' collar in English, were form of collars which overlaps and closes to the right side with a big lapel. This form of collar was influenced by the Manchu clothing. The Manchu's front overlap opening was a Manchu innovation; their clothing was closed with buttons on the centre front of the neck, right clavicle, and under the right arm along the right seams. The Manchu overlap was more shaped like an S-curved overlap; it ran straight to the right of the centre-front of the neck, drops down to the burst before curving to the right side. The Manchu's garments rarely showed high collars until the 20th century. The Pip-shaped collar were worn in the Qing dynasty and the Republic of China. It could be found without or with a high collar (e.g. mandarin collar).

Pipa-shaped collar in Han woman ao (jacket), Qing dynasty

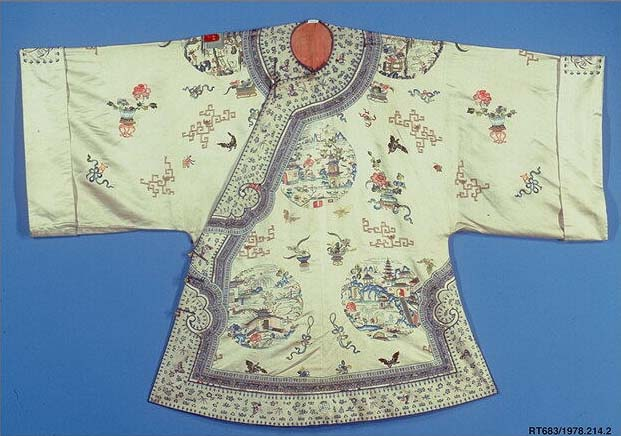
The collar of this ao (jacket) was influenced by the pipa-shaped collar, Qing dynasty

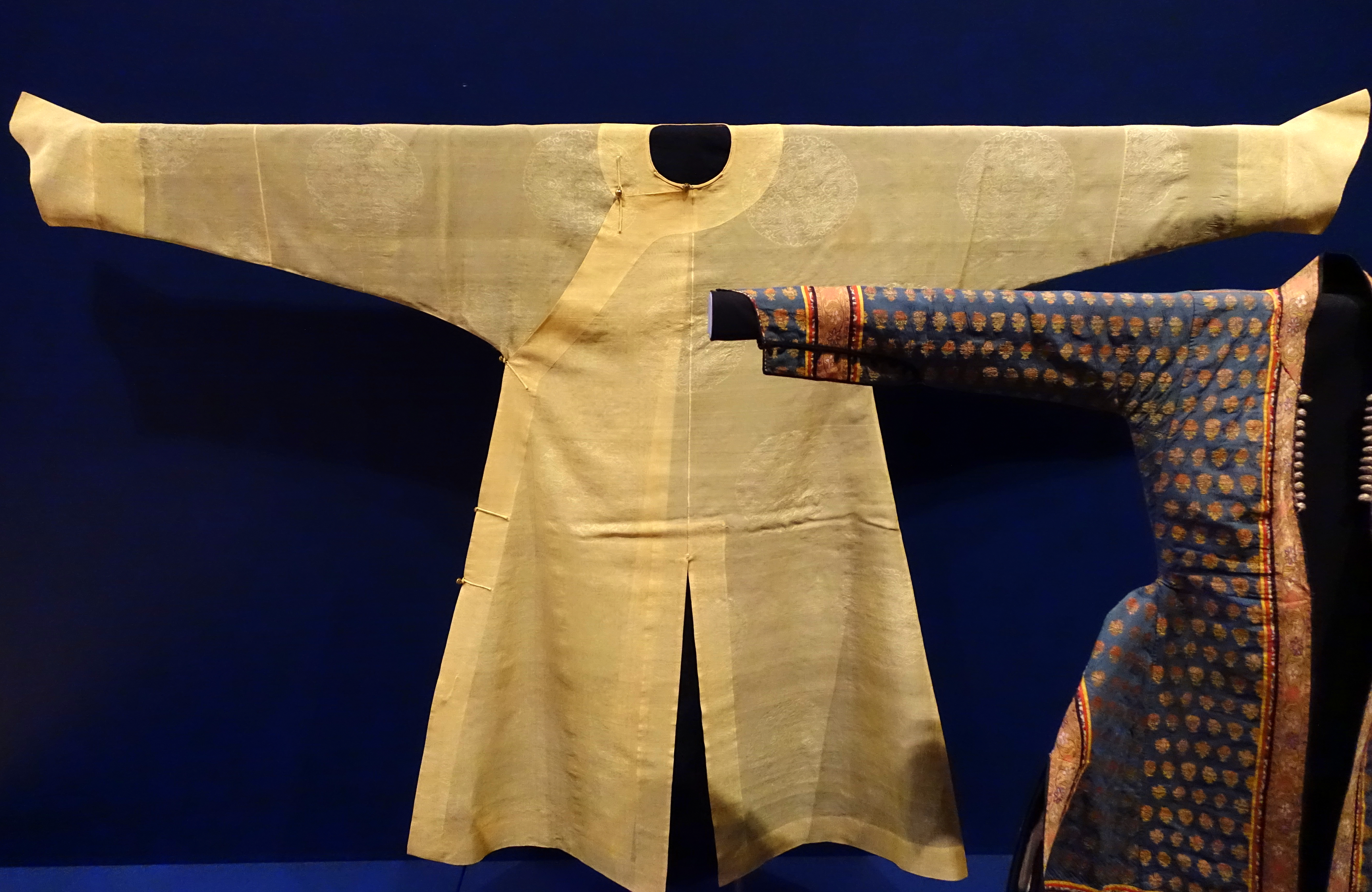
Manchu pipa-collar, Qing dynasty

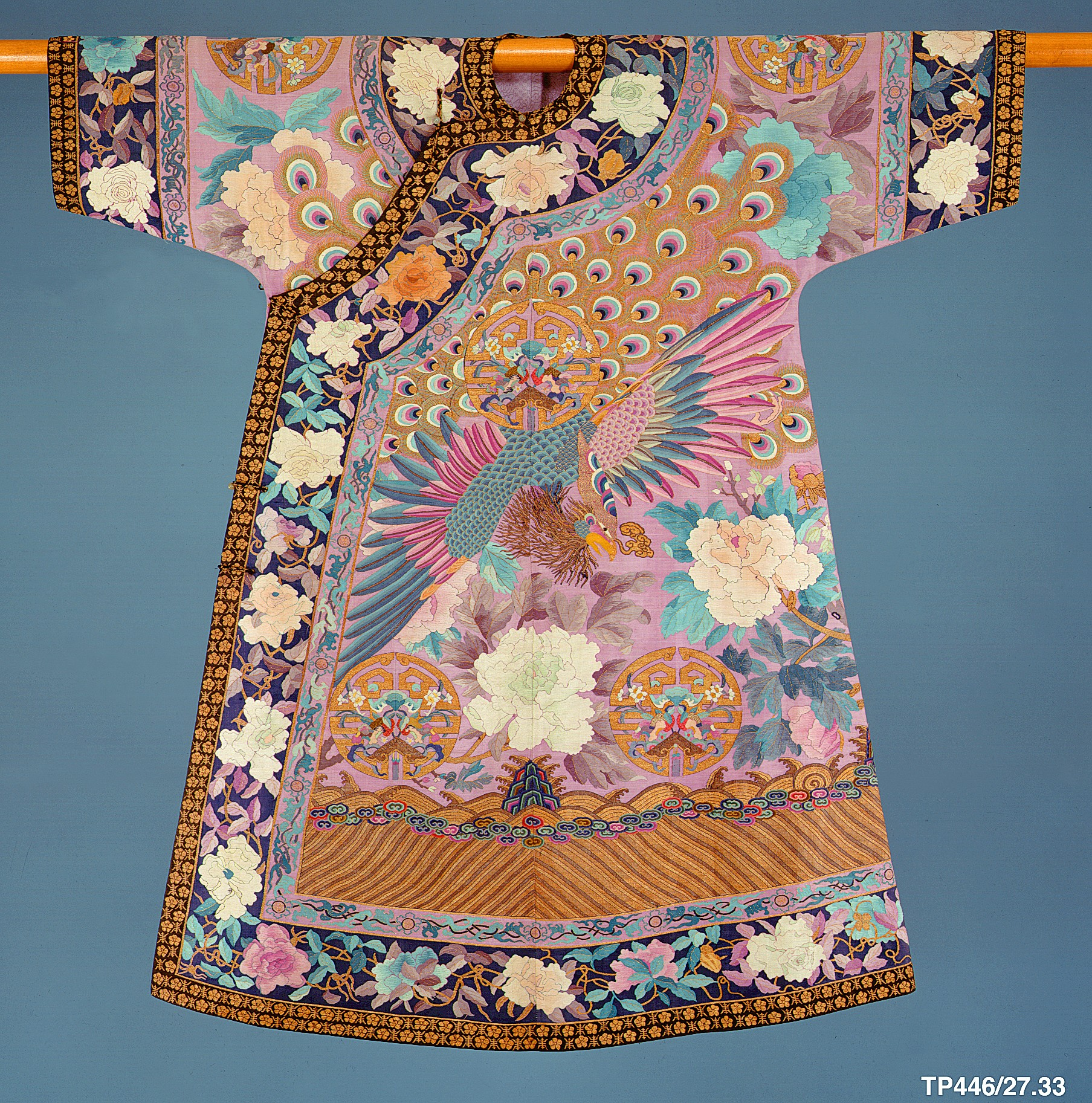
Manchu pipa-collar, Qing dynasty

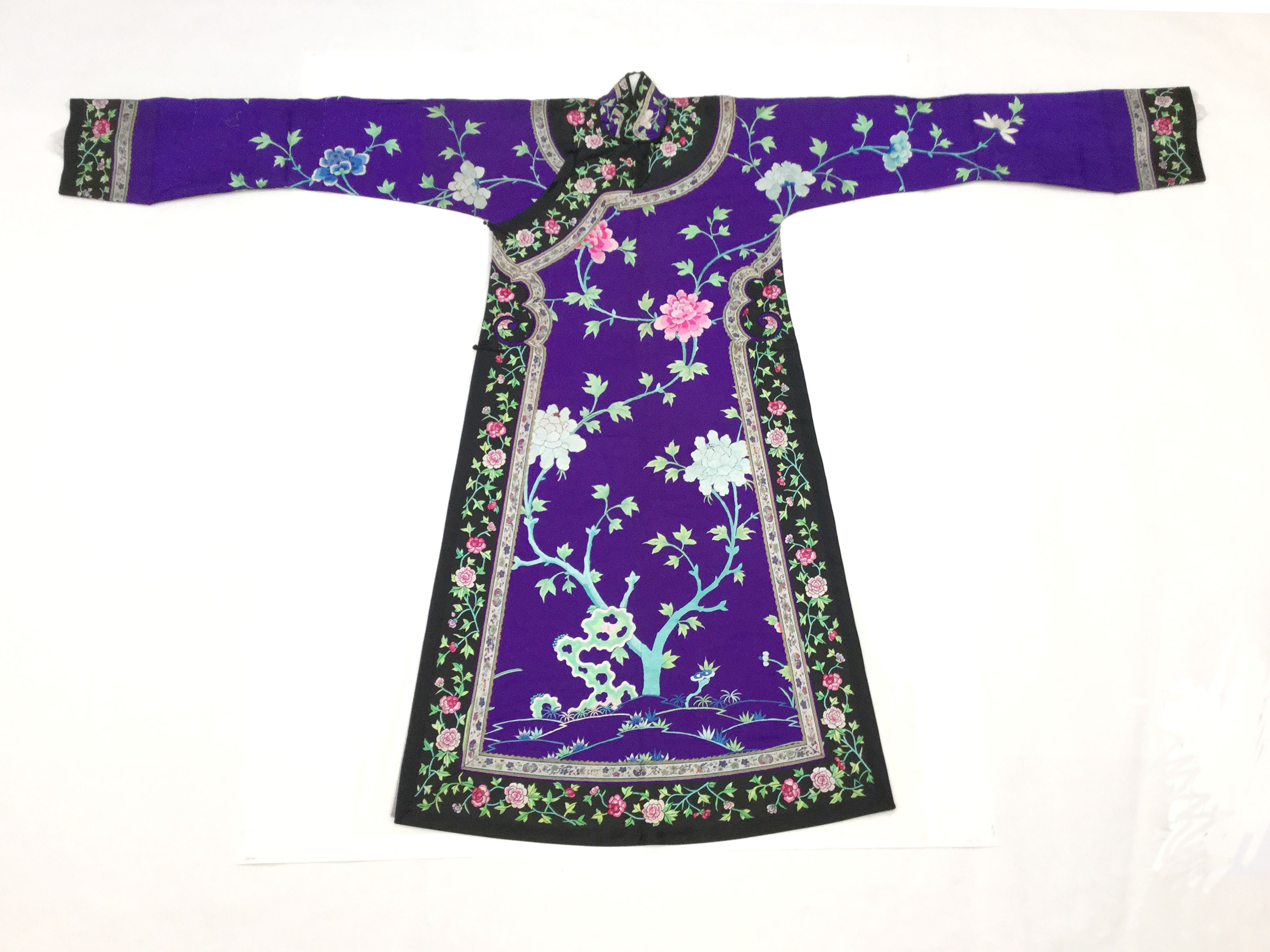
Manchu pipa-collar, Qing dynasty

== See also ==
- Han Chinese clothing
- List of Han Chinese clothing
- Hufu
