= Pibo =

Type of decorative silk shawl for Hanfu

披帛

Chinese name
- Chinese: 披帛
Transcriptions
Standard Mandarin
- Hanyu Pinyin: Pī bó

Korean name
- Hangul: 표
- Hanja: 裱
Transcriptions
- Revised Romanization: Pyo
- McCune–Reischauer: P'yo

Japanese name
- Kanji: 比礼、領巾
- Kana: ひれ
- Kyūjitai: 比禮、領巾
- Shinjitai: 比礼、領巾
Transcriptions
- Romanization: Hire

Pibo (Chinese: 披帛), also called Pizi (Chinese: 帔子), is a type of decorative silk shawl accessory for Hanfu. It was introduced to China through the Silk Road and popularized during the Tang dynasty, where it became an accessory for Han Chinese clothing. Pibo was subsequently passed on to the Korean Peninsula, Japan, and Vietnam. Primarily worn by women, it is often draped over the shoulders or wrapped around the elbows. While crossing the arms, it hangs at the back, creating an elegant and graceful appearance. The ceremonial silk is also frequently seen in depictions of deities and immortals.

== Description ==
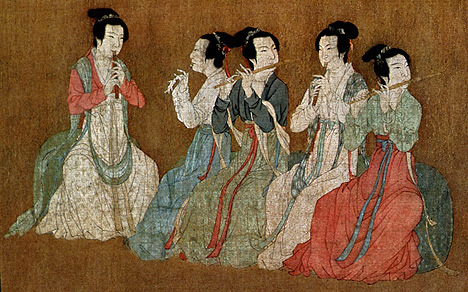
Female musicians wearing pibo in various way, Tang dynasty, depicted in The Night Revels of Han Xizai

The 'pibo' (披帛) garment can be divided into two major types, 'pi' (帔) and 'bo' (帛), with lengths often exceeding two meters. The materials are delicate and soft silk gauze adorned with bright and colorful designs. Decorative patterns can be made using various methods, such as embroidery, dyeing, or printing.

== History ==
The Pibo likely originated from Persian kingdoms in West Asia and potentially influenced by Hellenistic culture. It was possibly introduced to China via the Silk Road. It was particularly popular during the Sui and Tang Dynasty, where the silk pibo can be found both in the Western regions of Dunhuang and Turpan and the central region of Chang'an, reflecting the vibrant silk trade during that time.

In the poetry, murals, and artworks of the Sui and Tang dynasties, fashionable women are often depicted draped in pibo silks. In early Tang, one side of the garment was tucked into the skirt or the banbi, and the other end hung naturally over the shoulder. This style could be achieved using a shorter length of ceremonial silk. In the late Tang and Five Dynasties, it became fashionable to loop the ceremonial silk from behind and then have it drape over the arm, requiring a pibo with a length of about five meters or more.

== Gallery ==
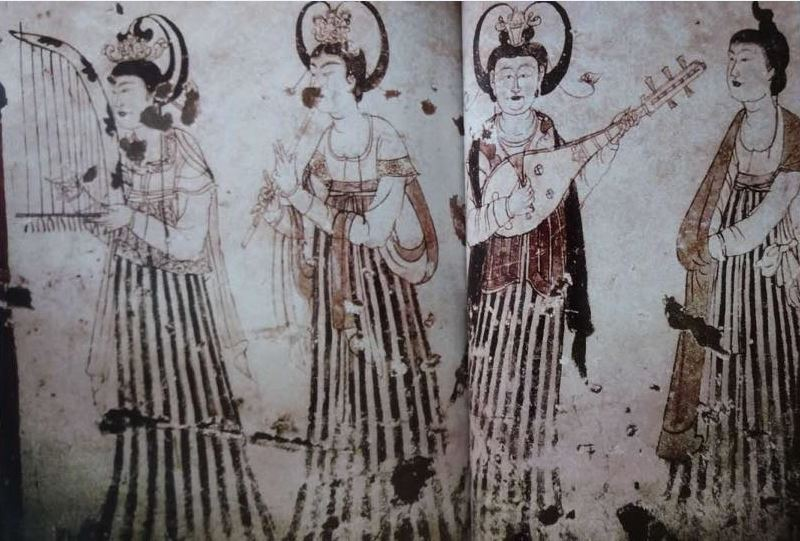
Female musicians wearing pibo, early Tang dynasty

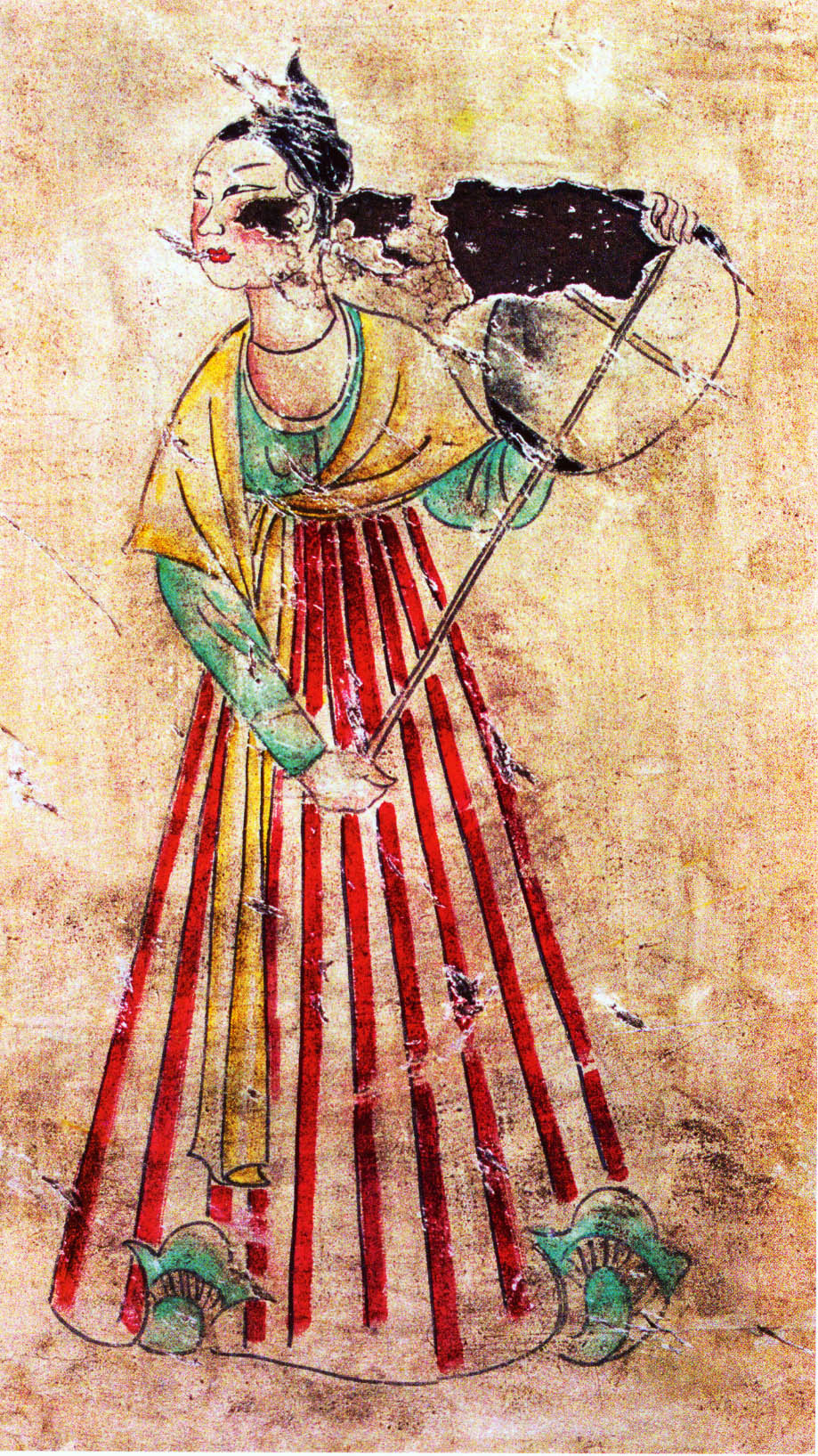
Handmaiden wearing Pibo in early Tang dynasty, depicted on mural

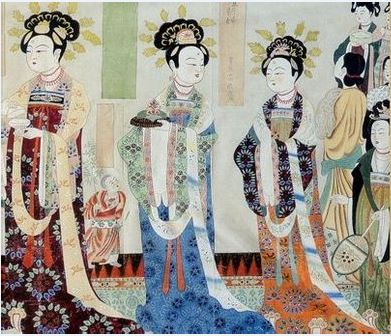
Female wearing pibo in Guiyi Circuit

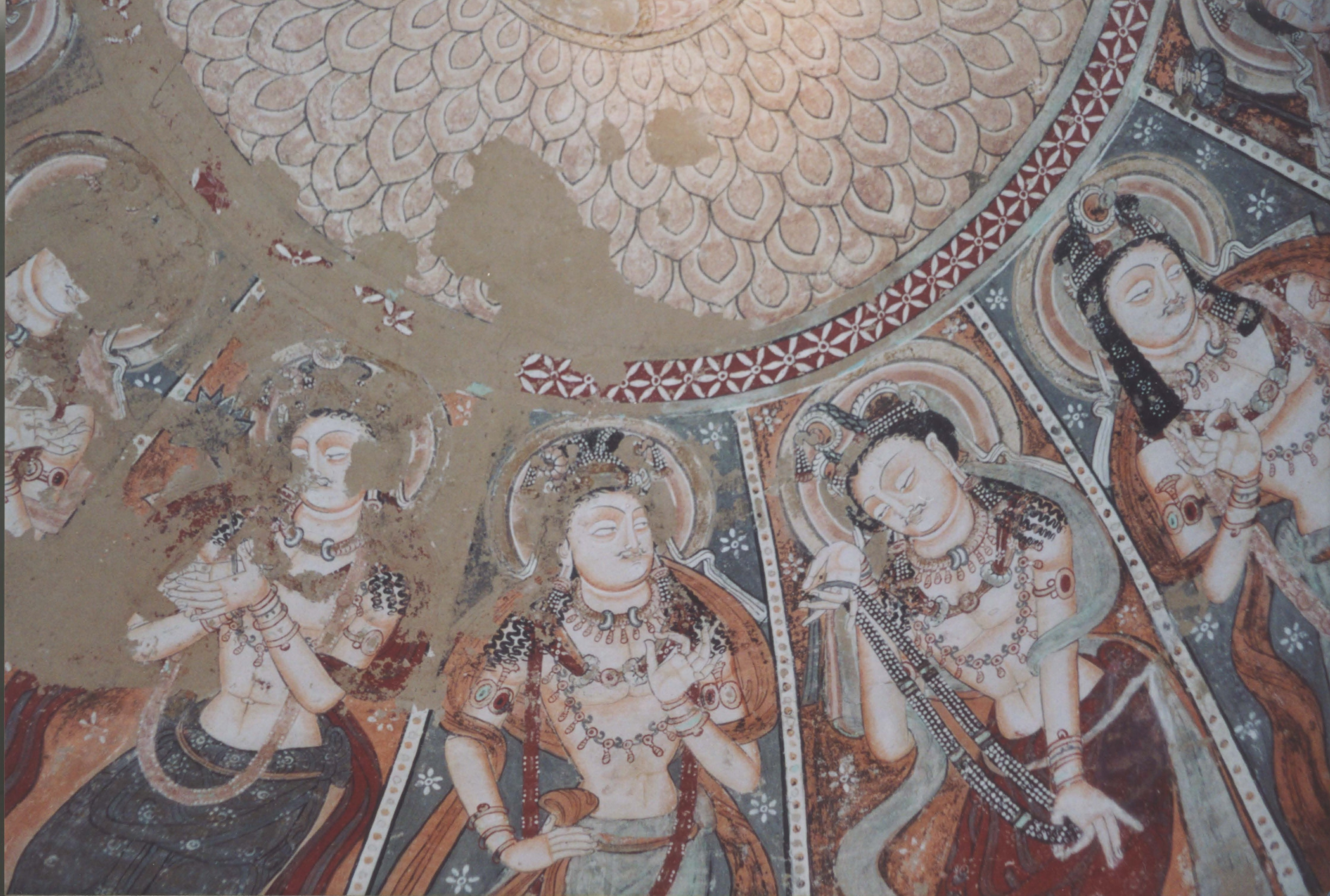
Male Bodhisattvas depicted in Pibo on murals in the Kizil Caves, Kingdom of Kucha (modern-day Xinjiang, China), 5th to 6th CE

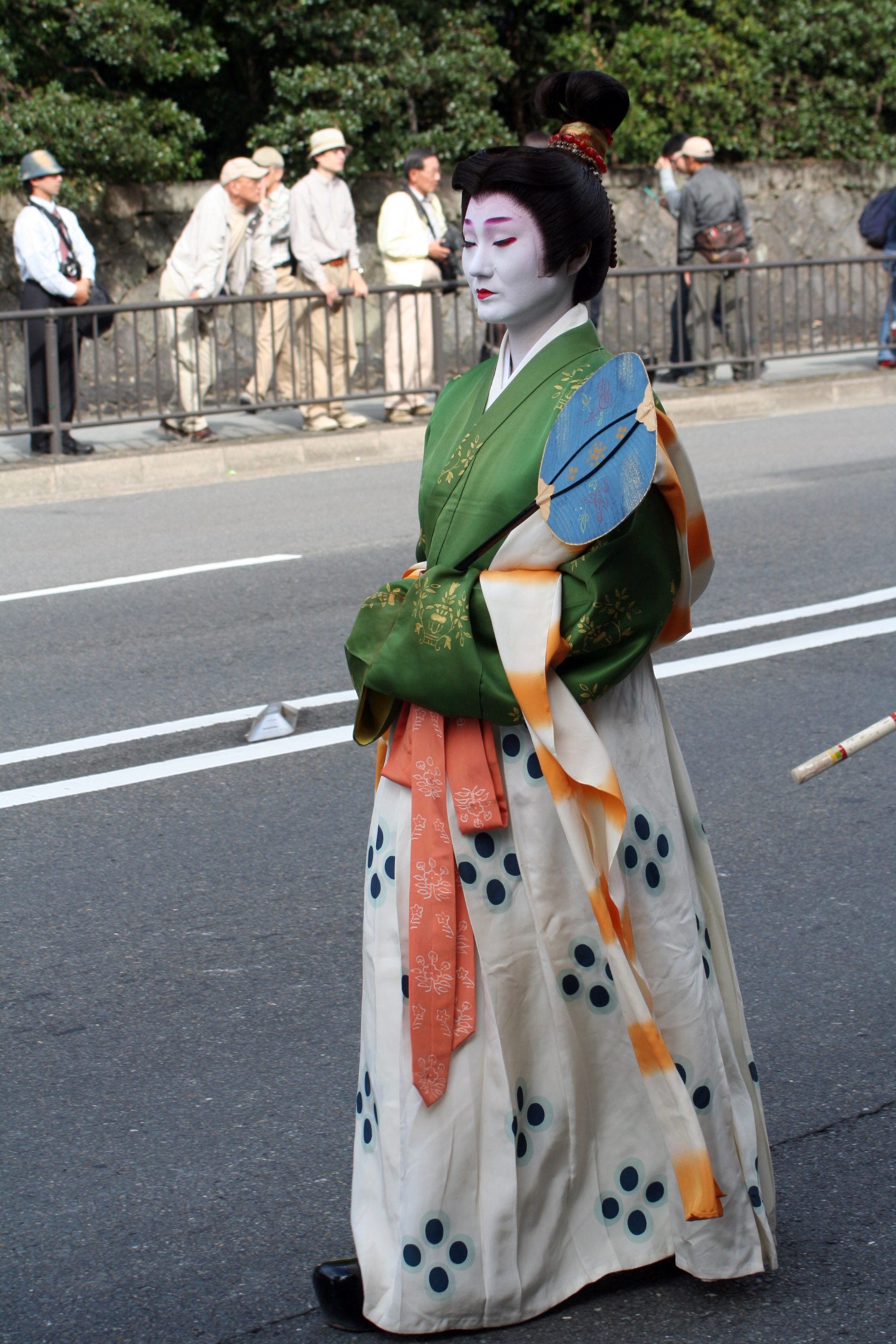
Actors portraying Nara period court women draped in Japanese style Pibo
